The  (BWV;) is a catalogue of compositions by Johann Sebastian Bach. It was first published in 1950, edited by Wolfgang Schmieder. The catalogue's second edition appeared in 1990. An abbreviated version of that second edition, known as BWV2a, was published in 1998.

The catalogue groups compositions by genre. Even within a genre, compositions are not necessarily collated chronologically. For example, BWV 992 was composed many years before BWV 1. BWV numbers were assigned to 1,126 compositions in the 20th century, and more have been added to the catalogue in the 21st century. The Anhang (Anh.; Annex) of the BWV lists over 200 lost, doubtful and spurious compositions.

History

The first edition of the Bach-Werke-Verzeichnis was published in 1950. It allocated a unique number to every known composition by Bach. Wolfgang Schmieder, the editor of that catalogue, grouped the compositions by genre, largely following the 19th-century Bach Gesellschaft (BG) edition for the collation (e.g., BG cantata number = BWV number of the cantata):
 Kantaten (Cantatas), BWV 1–224
 Motetten (Motets), BWV 225–231
 Messen, Messensätze, Magnificat (Masses, Mass movements, Magnificat), BWV 232–243
 Passionen, Oratorien (Passions, Oratorios), BWV 244–249
 Vierstimmige Choräle (Four-part chorales), BWV 250–438
 Lieder, Arien, Quodlibet (Songs, Arias and Quodlibet), BWV 439–524
 Werke für Orgel (Works for organ), BWV 525–771
 Werke für Klavier (Keyboard compositions), BWV 772–994
 Werke für Laute (Lute compositions), BWV 995–1000
 Kammermusik (Chamber music), BWV 1001–1040
 Orchesterwerke (Works for orchestra), BWV 1041–1071, originally in two separate chapters: Concertos (BWV 1041–1065) and Overtures (BWV 1066–1071)
 Kanons (Canons), BWV 1072–1078
 Musikalisches Opfer, Kunst der Fuge (Musical Offering, Art of the Fugue), BWV 1079–1080

The  of the BWV listed works that were not suitable for the main catalogue, in three sections:
 I – lost works, or works of which only a tiny fraction had survived (Anh. 1–23)
 II – works of dubious authenticity (Anh. 24–155)
 III – works that were once attributed to Bach, but for which it had been established they were not composed by him (Anh. 156–189)

Within each section of the  the works are sorted by genre, following the same sequence of genres as the main catalogue.

Several compositions were repositioned in the over-all structure of chapters organised by genre and  sections. In 1998 Alfred Dürr and Yoshitake Kobayashi published a small edition of the catalogue, based on the 1990 second edition. This edition, known as BWV2a, contained a few further updates and collation rearrangements.

New additions to BWV2/BWV2a included:
 BWV 1081–1126
 BWV Anh. 190–213

Numbers above BWV 1126 were added in the 21st century. A new revised version of the Bach-Werke-Verzeichnis has been announced by the Bach Archive for publication in 2020.

List of compositions by BWV number

The numbers assigned to compositions by Johann Sebastian Bach and by others in the Bach-Werke-Verzeichnis are widely used for the unique identification of these compositions. Exceptionally BWV numbers are also indicated as Schmieder (S) numbers (e.g. S. 225 = BWV 225).

BWV 1–1126
BWV numbers 1 to 1126 appear in the 1998 edition of the Bach-Werke-Verzeichnis.
 BWV 1 – Wie schön leuchtet der Morgenstern (cantata)
 BWV 2 – Ach Gott, vom Himmel sieh darein (cantata)
 BWV 3 – Ach Gott, wie manches Herzeleid (cantata)
 BWV 4 – Christ lag in Todes Banden (cantata):
 BWV 4.1 – early version
 BWV 4.2 – Leipzig version
 BWV 5 – Wo soll ich fliehen hin (cantata)
 BWV 6 – Bleib bei uns, denn es will Abend werden (cantata)
 BWV 7 – Christ unser Herr zum Jordan kam (cantata)
 BWV 8 – Liebster Gott, wenn werd ich sterben? (cantata):
 BWV 8.1 – first version
 BWV 8.2 – second version
 BWV 8/6 – "Herrscher über Tod und Leben" (closing chorale)
 BWV 9 – Es ist das Heil uns kommen her (cantata)
 BWV 10 – Meine Seel erhebt den Herren (cantata)
 BWV 11 – Lobet Gott in seinen Reichen (oratorio)
 BWV 12 – Weinen, Klagen, Sorgen, Zagen (cantata)
 BWV 13 – Meine Seufzer, meine Tränen (cantata)
 BWV 14 – Wär Gott nicht mit uns diese Zeit (cantata)
 BWV 15 – Denn du wirst meine Seele nicht in der Hölle lassen (cantata)
 BWV 16 – Herr Gott, dich loben wir (cantata)
 BWV 17 – Wer Dank opfert, der preiset mich (cantata)
 BWV 18 – Gleichwie der Regen und Schnee vom Himmel fällt (cantata):
 BWV 18.1 – early version
 BWV 18.2 – Leipzig version
 BWV 19 – Es erhub sich ein Streit (cantata)
 BWV 20 – O Ewigkeit, du Donnerwort (cantata)
 BWV 21 – Ich hatte viel Bekümmernis (cantata):
 BWV 21.1 – first version
 BWV 21.2 – second version
 BWV 21.3 – third version
 BWV 22 – Jesus nahm zu sich die Zwölfe (cantata)
 BWV 23 – Du wahrer Gott und Davids Sohn (cantata):
 BWV 23.1 – first version
 BWV 23.2 – second version
 BWV 23.3 – third version
 BWV 24 – Ein ungefärbt Gemüte (cantata)
 BWV 25 – Es ist nichts Gesundes an meinem Leibe (cantata)
 BWV 26 – Ach wie flüchtig, ach wie nichtig (cantata)
 BWV 27 – Wer weiß, wie nahe mir mein Ende? (cantata)
 BWV 28 – Gottlob! nun geht das Jahr zu Ende, BWV 28 (cantata)
 BWV 28/2a (formerly BWV 231) –  (motet, variant of second movement of BWV 28 and of BWV Anh. 160)
 BWV 29 – Wir danken dir, Gott, wir danken dir (cantata)
 BWV 30:
 BWV 30.1 (previously 30a) – Angenehmes Wiederau (secular cantata)
 BWV 30.2 (previously 30) – Freue dich, erlöste Schar (cantata)
 BWV 31 – Der Himmel lacht! Die Erde jubilieret (cantata):
 BWV 31.1 – Weimar version
 BWV 31.2 – Leipzig version
 BWV 32 – Liebster Jesu, mein Verlangen (cantata)
 BWV 33 – Allein zu dir, Herr Jesu Christ (cantata)
 BWV 34 – O ewiges Feuer, o Ursprung der Liebe (cantata):
 BWV 34.1 (previously 34) – for Pentecost
 BWV 34.2 (previously 34a) – for wedding
 BWV 35 – Geist und Seele wird verwirret (cantata)
 BWV 36:
 BWV 36.1 (previously 36c) – Schwingt freudig euch empor (secular cantata)
 BWV 36.2 (previously 36a) – Steigt freudig in die Luft (secular cantata)
 BWV 36.3 (previously 36b) – Die Freude reget sich (secular cantata)
 BWV 36.4 (previously 36 (1)) – Schwingt freudig euch empor (cantata), early version
 BWV 36.5 (previously 36 (2)) – Schwingt freudig euch empor (cantata) 
 BWV 37 – Wer da gläubet und getauft wird (cantata)
 BWV 38 – Aus tiefer Not schrei ich zu dir (cantata)
 BWV 39 – Brich dem Hungrigen dein Brot (cantata)
 BWV 40 – Darzu ist erschienen der Sohn Gottes (cantata)
 BWV 41 – Jesu, nun sei gepreiset (cantata)
 BWV 42 – Am Abend aber desselbigen Sabbats (cantata)
 BWV 43 – Gott fähret auf mit Jauchzen (cantata)
 BWV 43/11 – "Du Lebensfürst, Herr Jesu Christ" (closing chorale)
 BWV 44 – Sie werden euch in den Bann tun (cantata)
 BWV 45 – Es ist dir gesagt, Mensch, was gut ist (cantata)
 BWV 46 – Schauet doch und sehet, ob irgend ein Schmerz sei (cantata)
 BWV 47 – Wer sich selbst erhöhet, der soll erniedriget werden (cantata)
 BWV 48 – Ich elender Mensch, wer wird mich erlösen (cantata)
 BWV 49 – Ich geh und suche mit Verlangen (cantata)
 BWV 50 – Nun ist das Heil und die Kraft (cantata)
 BWV 51 – Jauchzet Gott in allen Landen (cantata)
 BWV 52 – Falsche Welt, dir trau ich nicht (cantata)
 BWV 53 – Schlage doch, gewünschte Stunde (cantata)
 BWV 54 – Widerstehe doch der Sünde (cantata)
 BWV 55 – Ich armer Mensch, ich Sündenknecht (cantata)
 BWV 56 – Ich will den Kreuzstab gerne tragen (cantata)
 BWV 57 – Selig ist der Mann (cantata)
 BWV 58 – Ach Gott, wie manches Herzeleid (cantata):
 BWV 58.1 – early version
 BWV 58.2 – later version
 BWV 59 – Wer mich liebet, der wird mein Wort halten (cantata)
 BWV 60 – O Ewigkeit, du Donnerwort (cantata)
 BWV 61 – Nun komm, der Heiden Heiland (cantata)
 BWV 62 – Nun komm, der Heiden Heiland (cantata)
 BWV 63 – Christen, ätzet diesen Tag (cantata)
 BWV 64 – Sehet, welch eine Liebe hat uns der Vater erzeiget (cantata)
 BWV 65 – Sie werden aus Saba alle kommen (cantata)
 BWV 66:
 BWV 66.1 (previously 66a) – Der Himmel dacht auf Anhalts Ruhm und Glück (secular cantata)
 BWV 66.2 (previously 66) – Erfreut euch, ihr Herzen (cantata)
 BWV 67 – Halt im Gedächtnis Jesum Christ (cantata)
 BWV 68 – Also hat Gott die Welt geliebt (cantata)
 BWV 69 – Lobe den Herrn, meine Seele (cantata):
 BWV 69.1 (previously 69a) – for the 12th Sunday after Trinity
 BWV 69.2 (previously 69) – for council election
 BWV 70 – Wachet! Betet! Betet! Wachet! (cantata):
 BWV 70.1 (previously 70a) – for the 2nd Sunday of Advent
 BWV 70.2 (previously 70) – for the 26th Sunday after Trinity
 BWV 71 – Gott ist mein König (cantata)
 BWV 72 – Alles nur nach Gottes Willen (cantata)
 BWV 73 – Herr, wie du willt, so schicks mit mir (cantata)
 BWV 74 – Wer mich liebet, der wird mein Wort halten (cantata)
 BWV 75 – Die Elenden sollen essen (cantata)
 BWV 76 – Die Himmel erzählen die Ehre Gottes (cantata)
 BWV 77 – Du sollt Gott, deinen Herren, lieben (cantata)
 BWV 78 – Jesu, der du meine Seele (cantata)
 BWV 79 – Gott der Herr ist Sonn und Schild (cantata)
 BWV 80:
 BWV 80.1 (previously 80a) – Alles, was von Gott geboren (cantata), Weimar version
 BWV 80.2 (previously 80b) – Ein feste Burg ist unser Gott (cantata), first Leipzig version
 BWV 80.3 (previously 80) – Ein feste Burg ist unser Gott (cantata), second Leipzig version
 BWV 81 – Jesus schläft, was soll ich hoffen? (cantata)
 BWV 82 – Ich habe genug (cantata):
 BWV 82.1 – first version
 BWV 82.2 – second version
 BWV 82.3 – third version
 BWV 83 – Erfreute Zeit im neuen Bunde (cantata)
 BWV 84 – Ich bin vergnügt mit meinem Glücke (cantata)
 BWV 85 – Ich bin ein guter Hirt (cantata)
 BWV 86 – Wahrlich, wahrlich, ich sage euch (cantata)
 BWV 87 – Bisher habt ihr nichts gebeten in meinem Namen (cantata)
 BWV 88 – Siehe, ich will viel Fischer aussenden (cantata)
 BWV 89 – Was soll ich aus dir machen, Ephraim (cantata)
 BWV 90 – Es reißet euch ein schrecklich Ende (cantata)
 BWV 91 – Gelobet seist du, Jesu Christ (cantata):
 BWV 91.1 – early version
 BWV 91.2 – later version
 BWV 92 – Ich hab in Gottes Herz und Sinn (cantata)
 BWV 93 – Wer nur den lieben Gott läßt walten (cantata)
 BWV 94 – Was frag ich nach der Welt (cantata)
 BWV 95 – Christus, der ist mein Leben (cantata)
 BWV 96 – Herr Christ, der einge Gottessohn (cantata)
 BWV 97 – In allen meinen Taten (cantata)
 BWV 98 – Was Gott tut, das ist wohlgetan (cantata)
 BWV 99 – Was Gott tut, das ist wohlgetan (cantata)
 BWV 100 – Was Gott tut, das ist wohlgetan (cantata)
 BWV 101 – Nimm von uns, Herr, du treuer Gott (cantata)
 BWV 102 – Herr, deine Augen sehen nach dem Glauben (cantata)
 BWV 103 – Ihr werdet weinen und heulen (cantata)
 BWV 104 – Du Hirte Israel, höre (cantata)
 BWV 105 – Herr, gehe nicht ins Gericht mit deinem Knecht (cantata)
 BWV 106 – Gottes Zeit ist die allerbeste Zeit (cantata)
 BWV 107 – Was willst du dich betrüben (cantata)
 BWV 108 – Es ist euch gut, daß ich hingehe (cantata)
 BWV 109 – Ich glaube, lieber Herr, hilf meinem Unglauben (cantata)
 BWV 110 – Unser Mund sei voll Lachens (cantata)
 BWV 111 – Was mein Gott will, das g'scheh allzeit (cantata)
 BWV 112 – Der Herr ist mein getreuer Hirt (cantata)
 BWV 113 – Herr Jesu Christ, du höchstes Gut (cantata)
 BWV 114 – Ach, lieben Christen, seid getrost (cantata)
 BWV 115 – Mache dich, mein Geist, bereit (cantata)
 BWV 116 – Du Friedefürst, Herr Jesu Christ (cantata)
 BWV 117 – Sei Lob und Ehr dem höchsten Gut (cantata)
 BWV 118 – O Jesu Christ, meins Lebens Licht (motet):
 BWV 118.1 – first version
 BWV 118.2 – second version
 BWV 119 – Preise, Jerusalem, den Herrn (cantata)
 BWV 120:
 BWV 120.1 (previously 120) – Gott, man lobet dich in der Stille (cantata)
 BWV 120.2 (previously 120a) – Herr Gott, Beherrscher aller Dinge (cantata)
 BWV 120.3 (previously 120b) – Gott, man lobet dich in der Stille (cantata), for the 200th Anniversary of the Augsburg Confession
 BWV 121 – Christum wir sollen loben schon (cantata)
 BWV 122 – Das neugeborne Kindelein (cantata)
 BWV 123 – Liebster Immanuel, Herzog der Frommen (cantata)
 BWV 124 – Meinen Jesum laß ich nicht (cantata)
 BWV 125 – Mit Fried und Freud ich fahr dahin (cantata)
 BWV 126 – Erhalt uns, Herr, bei deinem Wort (cantata)
 BWV 127 – Herr Jesu Christ, wahr' Mensch und Gott (cantata)
 BWV 128 – Auf Christi Himmelfahrt allein (cantata)
 BWV 129 – Gelobet sei der Herr, mein Gott (cantata)
 BWV 130 – Herr Gott, dich loben alle wir (cantata):
BWV 130.1 – first version
BWV 130.2 – second version
 BWV 131 – Aus der Tiefen rufe ich, Herr, zu dir (cantata)
 BWV 131a – Fugue in G minor (after 5th movement of BWV 131)
 BWV 132 – Bereitet die Wege, bereitet die Bahn (cantata)
 BWV 133 – Ich freue mich in dir (cantata)
 BWV 134:
 BWV 134.1 (previously 134a) – Die Zeit, die Tag und Jahre macht (secular cantata)
 BWV 134.2 (previously 134) – Ein Herz, das seinen Jesum lebend weiß (cantata), early version
 BWV 134.3 (previously 134) – Ein Herz, das seinen Jesum lebend weiß (cantata), later version
 BWV 135 – Ach Herr, mich armen Sünder (cantata)
 BWV 136 – Erforsche mich, Gott, und erfahre mein Herz (cantata)
 BWV 137 – Lobe den Herren, den mächtigen König der Ehren (cantata)
 BWV 138 – Warum betrübst du dich, mein Herz (cantata)
 BWV 139 – Wohl dem, der sich auf seinen Gott (cantata)
 BWV 140 – Wachet auf, ruft uns die Stimme (cantata)
 BWV 141 – Das ist je gewißlich wahr (cantata)
 BWV 142 – Uns ist ein Kind geboren (cantata)
 BWV 143 – Lobe den Herrn, meine Seele (cantata)
 BWV 144 – Nimm, was dein ist, und gehe hin (cantata)
 BWV 145 – Ich lebe, mein Herze, zu deinem Ergötzen (cantata)
 BWV 145/b – "So du mit deinem Munde bekennest Jesum" (cantata movement, basis for BWV 145/2)
 BWV 146 – Wir müssen durch viel Trübsal (cantata)
 BWV 147 – Herz und Mund und Tat und Leben (cantata):
 BWV 147.1 (previously 147a) – for the 4th Sunday of Advent
 BWV 147.2 (previously 147) – for the Visitation of Mary
 BWV 148 – Bringet dem Herrn Ehre seines Namens (cantata)
 BWV 149 – Man singet mit Freuden vom Sieg (cantata)
 BWV 149/1a (formerly BWV Anh. 198) – start (sinfonia) of an abandoned cantata, possibly a first attempt to set the libretto of BWV 149
 BWV 150 – Nach dir, Herr, verlanget mich (cantata)
 BWV 151 – Süßer Trost, mein Jesus kömmt (cantata)
 BWV 152 – Tritt auf die Glaubensbahn (cantata)
 BWV 153 – Schau, lieber Gott, wie meine Feind (cantata)
 BWV 154 – Mein liebster Jesus ist verloren (cantata)
 BWV 155 – Mein Gott, wie lang, ach lange? (cantata)
 BWV 156 – Ich steh mit einem Fuß im Grabe (cantata)
 BWV 157 – Ich lasse dich nicht, du segnest mich denn (cantata):
 BWV 157.1 – libretto as published by Picander
 BWV 157.2 – extant cantata: libretto as used at Ponickau's funeral service in Pomßen
 BWV 158 – Der Friede sei mit dir (cantata)
 BWV 159 – Sehet, wir gehn hinauf gen Jerusalem (cantata)
 BWV 160 – Ich weiß, daß mein Erlöser lebt (cantata)
 BWV 161 – Komm, du süße Todesstunde (cantata)
 BWV 162 – Ach! ich sehe, itzt, da ich zur Hochzeit gehe (cantata):
 BWV 162.1 – Weimar version
 BWV 162.2 – Leipzig version
 BWV 163 – Nur jedem das Seine (cantata)
 BWV 164 – Ihr, die ihr euch von Christo nennet (cantata)
 BWV 165 – O heilges Geist- und Wasserbad (cantata)
 BWV 166 – Wo gehest du hin? (cantata)
 BWV 167 – Ihr Menschen, rühmet Gottes Liebe (cantata)
 BWV 168 – Tue Rechnung! Donnerwort (cantata)
 BWV 169 – Gott soll allein mein Herze haben (cantata)
 BWV 170 – Vergnügte Ruh, beliebte Seelenlust (cantata)
 BWV 171 – Gott, wie dein Name, so ist auch dein Ruhm (cantata)
 BWV 172 – Erschallet, ihr Lieder, erklinget, ihr Saiten! (cantata):
 BWV 172.1 – Weimar version
 BWV 172.2 – second version
 BWV 172.3 – third version
 BWV 173:
 BWV 173.1 (previously 173a) – Durchlauchtster Leopold (secular cantata)
 BWV 173.2 (previously 173) – Erhöhtes Fleisch und Blut (cantata)
 BWV 174 – Ich liebe den Höchsten von ganzem Gemüte (cantata)
 BWV 175 – Er rufet seinen Schafen mit Namen (cantata)
 BWV 176 – Es ist ein trotzig und verzagt Ding (cantata)
 BWV 177 – Ich ruf zu dir, Herr Jesu Christ (cantata)
 BWV 178 – Wo Gott der Herr nicht bei uns hält (cantata)
 BWV 179 – Siehe zu, daß deine Gottesfurcht nicht Heuchelei sei (cantata)
 BWV 180 – Schmücke dich, o liebe Seele (cantata)
 BWV 181 – Leichtgesinnte Flattergeister (cantata)
 BWV 182 – Himmelskönig, sei willkommen (cantata)
 BWV 183 – Sie werden euch in den Bann tun (cantata)
 BWV 184:
 BWV 184.1 (previously 184a) – secular cantata for New Year 1721 (model for some movements of BWV 184)
 BWV 184.2 (previously 184) – Erwünschtes Freudenlicht (cantata)
 BWV 185 – Barmherziges Herze der ewigen Liebe (cantata):
 BWV 185.1 – Weimar version
 BWV 185.2 – Leipzig version
 BWV 186 – Ärgre dich, o Seele, nicht (cantata):
 BWV 186.1 (previously 186a) – for the 3rd Sunday of Advent
 BWV 186.2 (previously 186) – for the 7th Sunday after Trinity
 BWV 187 – Es wartet alles auf dich (cantata)
 BWV 188 – Ich habe meine Zuversicht (cantata)
 BWV 189 – Meine Seele rühmt und preist (cantata)
 BWV 190 – Singet dem Herrn ein neues Lied (cantata):
 BWV 190.1 (previously 190) – for New Year
 BWV 190.2 (previously 190a) – for the 200th Anniversary of the Augsburg Confession
 BWV 191 – Gloria in excelsis Deo (cantata; church music in Latin)
 BWV 192 – Nun danket alle Gott (cantata)
 BWV 193:
 BWV 193.1 (previously 193a) – Ihr Häuser des Himmels, ihr scheinenden Lichter (secular cantata)
 BWV 193.2 (previously 193) – Ihr Tore zu Zion (cantata)
 BWV 194:
 BWV 194.1 (previously 194a) – model for BWV 194 (secular cantata)
 BWV 194.2 (previously 194) – Höchsterwünschtes Freudenfest (cantata), Störmthal version
 BWV 194.3 (previously 194) – Höchsterwünschtes Freudenfest (cantata), first Leipzig version
 BWV 194.4 (previously 194) – second Leipzig version
 BWV 195 – Dem Gerechten muß das Licht (cantata):
 BWV 195.1 – first version
 BWV 195.2 – second version
 BWV 195.3 – latest version
 BWV 196 – Der Herr denket an uns (cantata)
 BWV 197:
 BWV 197.1 (previously 197a) – Ehre sei Gott in der Höhe (cantata)
 BWV 197.2 (previously 197) – Gott ist unsre Zuversicht (cantata)
 BWV 198 – Laß, Fürstin, laß noch einen Strahl a.k.a. Mourning Ode (secular cantata)
 BWV 199 – Mein Herze schwimmt im Blut (cantata):
 BWV 199.1 – Weimar version
 BWV 199.2 – Köthen version
 BWV 199.3 – Leipzig version
 BWV 200 – "Bekennen will ich seinen Namen", after "Dein Kreuz, o Bräutgam meiner Seelen" by Gottfried Heinrich Stölzel (aria)
 BWV 201 – Geschwinde, ihr wirbelnden Winde a.k.a. The Dispute between Phoebus and Pan (secular cantata)
 BWV 202 – Weichet nur, betrübte Schatten (secular cantata)
 BWV 203 – Amore traditore (secular cantata)
 BWV 204 – Ich bin in mir vergnügt a.k.a. On Contentedness (secular cantata)
 BWV 205:
 BWV 205.1 (previously 205) – Zerreißet, zersprenget, zertrümmert die Gruft a.k.a. Aeolus Placated (secular cantata)
 BWV 205.2 (previously 205a) – Blast Lärmen, ihr Feinde (secular cantata)
 BWV 206 – Schleicht, spielende Wellen (secular cantata):
 BWV 206.1 – first version
 BWV 206.2 – second version
 BWV 207:
 BWV 207.1 (previously 207) – Vereinigte Zwietracht der wechselnden Saiten (secular cantata)
 BWV 207.2 (previously 207a) – Auf, schmetternde Töne der muntern Trompeten (secular cantata)
 BWV 208 – Was mir behagt, ist nur die muntre Jagd a.k.a. Hunting Cantata (secular cantata):
 BWV 208.1 (previously 208) – Weißenfels version
 BWV 208.2 (previously 208a) – Weimar version
 BWV 208.3 (previously 208a) – Leipzig version
 BWV 209 – Non sa che sia dolore (secular cantata)
 BWV 210:
 BWV 210.1 (previously 210a) – O angenehme Melodei (secular cantata)
 BWV 210.2 (previously 210) – O holder Tag, erwünschte Zeit (secular cantata)
 BWV 211 – Schweigt stille, plaudert nicht a.k.a. Coffee Cantata (secular cantata)
 BWV 212 – Mer hahn en neue Oberkeet a.k.a. Peasant Cantata (secular cantata)
 BWV 213 – Laßt uns sorgen, laßt uns wachen a.k.a. Hercules at the Crossroads (secular cantata)
 BWV 214 – Tönet, ihr Pauken! Erschallet, Trompeten! (secular cantata)
 BWV 215 – Preise dein Glücke, gesegnetes Sachsen (secular cantata)
 BWV 216:
 BWV 216.1 (previously 216) – Vergnügte Pleißenstadt (secular cantata)
 BWV 216.2 (previously 216a) – Erwählte Pleißenstadt a.k.a. Apollo and Mercurius (secular cantata)
 BWV 217 – Gedenke, Herr, wie es uns gehet (cantata)
 BWV 218 – Gott der Hoffnung erfülle euch (cantata)
 BWV 219 – Siehe, es hat überwunden der Löwe (cantata)
 BWV 220 – Lobt ihn mit Herz und Munde (cantata)
 BWV 221 – Wer sucht die Pracht, wer wünscht den Glanz (cantata)
 BWV 222 – Mein Odem ist schwach (cantata)
 BWV 223 – Meine Seele soll Gott loben (cantata)
 BWV 224 – Reißt euch los, bedrängte Sinnen (cantata)
 BWV 225 –  (motet)
 BWV 226 –  (motet)
 BWV 227 –  (motet)
 BWV 228 –  (motet)
 BWV 229 –  (motet)
 BWV 230 –  (motet)
 BWV 231 (renumbered to BWV 28/2a, see above)
 BWV 232 – Mass in B minor (church music in Latin)
 BWV 233 – Kyrie–Gloria Mass in F major (church music in Latin)
 BWV 233a – Kyrie "Christe, du Lamm Gottes" in F major (variants of Kyrie from BWV 233; church music in Latin)
 BWV 234 – Kyrie–Gloria Mass in A major (church music in Latin)
 BWV 235 – Kyrie–Gloria Mass in G minor (church music in Latin)
 BWV 236 – Kyrie–Gloria Mass in G major (church music in Latin)
 BWV 237 – Sanctus in C major (church music in Latin)
 BWV 238 – Sanctus in D major (church music in Latin)
 BWV 239 – Sanctus in D minor (church music in Latin, arrangement)
 BWV 240 – Sanctus in G major (church music in Latin)
 BWV 241 – Sanctus in D major (church music in Latin, arrangement)
 BWV 242 – Christe eleison in G minor (church music in Latin)
 BWV 243 – Magnificat (church music in Latin):
 BWV 243.1 (previously 243a) – early version in E-flat major
 BWV 243.2 (previously 243) – D major version
 BWV 244 – St Matthew Passion (Passion setting):
 BWV 244.1 (previously 244b) – early version
 BWV 244.2 (previously 244) – later versions
 BWV 244a (renumbered to BWV 1143, see below)
 BWV 245 – St John Passion (Passion setting)
 BWV 245.1 – first version (1724)
 BWV 245.2 – second version (1725), including:
 BWV 245a – "Himmel reiße, Welt erbebe" (aria)
 BWV 245b – "Zerschmettert mich, ihr Felsen und ihr Hügel" (aria)
 BWV 245c – "Ach, windet euch nicht so, geplagte Seelen" (arioso)
 BWV 245.3 – third version (1732?)
 BWV 245.4 – incomplete revision of 1739
 BWV 245.5 – fourth version (1749)
 BWV 246 – St Luke Passion (Passion setting)
 BWV 246/40a – "Aus der Tiefen rufe ich" (chorale)
 BWV 247 – St Mark Passion (music lost; Passion setting)
 BWV 248 – Christmas Oratorio (consisting of six cantatas)
 BWV 248VIa – (textless cantata, model for the sixth cantata of BWV 248)
 BWV 249:
 BWV 249.1 (previously 249a) – Entfliehet, verschwindet, entweichet, ihr Sorgen a.k.a. Shepherd Cantata (secular cantata)
 BWV 249.2 (previously 249b) – Verjaget, zerstreuet, zerrüttet, ihr Sterne a.k.a. The Celebration of Genius (secular cantata)
 BWV 249.3 (previously 249) – Easter Oratorio, early version
 BWV 249.4 (previously 249) – Easter Oratorio, middle version
 BWV 249.5 (previously 249) – Easter Oratorio, later version
 BWV 250 – "Was Gott tut, das ist wohlgetan" (Three wedding chorales No. 1)
 BWV 251 – "Sei Lob und Ehr dem höchsten Gut" (Three wedding chorales No. 2)
 BWV 252 – "Nun danket alle Gott" (Three wedding chorales No. 3)
 BWV 253 – "Ach bleib bei uns, Herr Jesu Christ" (four-part chorale)
 BWV 254 – "Ach Gott, erhör mein Seufzen" (four-part chorale)
 BWV 255 – "Ach Gott und Herr" (four-part chorale)
 BWV 256 – "Ach lieben Christen seid getrost" (four-part chorale)
 BWV 257 – "Wär Gott nicht mit uns diese Zeit" (four-part chorale)
 BWV 258 – "Wo Gott der Herr nicht bei uns hält" (four-part chorale)
 BWV 259 – "Ach, was soll ich Sünder machen" (four-part chorale)
 BWV 260 – "Allein Gott in der Höh sei Ehr" (four-part chorale)
 BWV 261 – "Allein zu dir, Herr Jesu Christ" (four-part chorale)
 BWV 262 – "Alle Menschen müssen sterben" (four-part chorale)
 BWV 263 – "Alles ist an Gottes Segen" (four-part chorale)
 BWV 264 – "Als der gütige Gott" (four-part chorale)
 BWV 265 – "Als Jesus Christus in der Nacht" (four-part chorale)
 BWV 266 – "Als vierzig Tag nach Ostern warn" (four-part chorale)
 BWV 267 – "An Wasserflüssen Babylon" (or) "Ein Lämmlein geht und trägt die Schuld" (four-part chorale)
 BWV 268 – "Auf, auf, mein Herz, und du mein ganzer Sinn" (four-part chorale)
 BWV 269 – "Aus meines Herzens Grunde" (four-part chorale)
 BWV 270 – "Befiehl du deine Wege" (four-part chorale)
 BWV 271 – "Befiehl du deine Wege" (four-part chorale)
 BWV 272 – "Befiehl du deine Wege" (four-part chorale)
 BWV 273 – "Christ, der du bist der helle Tag" (four-part chorale)
 BWV 274 – "Christe, der du bist Tag und Licht" (four-part chorale)
 BWV 275 – "Christ, du Beistand deiner Kreuzgemeine" (four-part chorale)
 BWV 276 – "Christ ist erstanden" (four-part chorale)
 BWV 277 – "Christ lag in Todesbanden" (four-part chorale)
 BWV 278 – "Christ lag in Todesbanden" (four-part chorale)
 BWV 279 – "Christ lag in Todesbanden" (four-part chorale)
 BWV 280 – "Christ unser Herr zum Jordan kam" (four-part chorale)
 BWV 281 – "Christus, der ist mein Leben" (four-part chorale)
 BWV 282 – "Christus, der ist mein Leben" (four-part chorale)
 BWV 283 – "Christus, der uns selig macht" (four-part chorale)
 BWV 284 – "Christus ist erstanden, hat überwunden" (four-part chorale)
 BWV 285 – "Da der Herr Christ zu Tische saß" (four-part chorale)
 BWV 286 – "Danket dem Herrn, denn er ist sehr freundlich" (four-part chorale)
 BWV 287 – "Dank sei Gott in der Höhe" (four-part chorale)
 BWV 288 – "Das alte Jahr vergangen ist" (four-part chorale)
 BWV 289 – "Das alte Jahr vergangen ist" (four-part chorale)
 BWV 290 – "Das walt Gott Vater und Gott Sohn" (four-part chorale)
 BWV 291 – "Das walt mein Gott" (four-part chorale)
 BWV 292 – "Den Vater dort oben" (four-part chorale)
 BWV 293 – "Der du bist drei in Einigkeit" (four-part chorale)
 BWV 294 – "Der Tag, der ist so freudenreich" (four-part chorale)
 BWV 295 – "Des Heilgen Geistes reiche Gnad" (four-part chorale)
 BWV 296 – "Die Nacht ist kommen" (four-part chorale)
 BWV 297 – "Die Sonn hat sich mit ihrem Glanz gewendet" (four-part chorale)
 BWV 298 – "Dies sind die heilgen zehn Gebot" (four-part chorale)
 BWV 299 – "Dir, dir, Jehova, will ich singen" (four-part chorale)
 BWV 300 – "Du großer Schmerzensmann" (four-part chorale)
 BWV 301 – "Du, o schönes Weltgebäude" (four-part chorale)
 BWV 302 – "Ein feste Burg ist unser Gott" (four-part chorale)
 BWV 303 – "Ein feste Burg ist unser Gott" (four-part chorale)
 BWV 304 – "Eins ist not, ach Herr, dies Eine" (four-part chorale)
 BWV 305 – "Erbarm dich mein, o Herre Gott" (four-part chorale)
 BWV 306 – "Erstanden ist der heilig Christ" (four-part chorale)
 BWV 307 – "Es ist gewisslich an der Zeit" (four-part chorale)
 BWV 308 – "Es spricht der Unweisen Mund wohl" (four-part chorale)
 BWV 309 – "Es stehn vor Gottes Throne" (four-part chorale)
 BWV 310 – "Es wird schier der letzte Tag herkommen" (four-part chorale)
 BWV 311 – "Es woll uns Gott gnädig sein" (four-part chorale)
 BWV 312 – "Es woll uns Gott gnädig sein" (four-part chorale)
 BWV 313 – "Für Freuden lasst uns springen" (four-part chorale)
 BWV 314 – "Gelobt seist du, Jesu Christ" (four-part chorale)
 BWV 315 – "Gib dich zufrieden und sei stille" (four-part chorale)
 BWV 316 – "Gott, der du selber bist das Licht" (four-part chorale)
 BWV 317 – "Gott der Vater wohn uns bei" (four-part chorale)
 BWV 318 – "Gottes Sohn ist kommen" (four-part chorale)
 BWV 319 – "Gott hat das Evangelium" (four-part chorale)
 BWV 320 – "Gott lebet noch" (four-part chorale)
 BWV 321 – "Gottlob, es geht nunmehr zum Ende" (four-part chorale)
 BWV 322 – "Gott sei gelobet und gebenedeiet" (four-part chorale)
 BWV 323 – "Gott sei uns gnädig und barmherzig" (four-part chorale)
 BWV 324 – "Meine Seele erhebet den Herren" (four-part chorale)
 BWV 325 – "Heilig, heilig" (or) "Sanctus, Sanctus Dominus Deus Sabaoth" (four-part chorale)
 BWV 326 – "Herr Gott, dich loben alle wir" (four-part chorale)
 BWV 327 – "Vor deinen Thron tret ich hiermit" (four-part chorale)
 BWV 328 – "Herr Gott, dich loben wir" (four-part chorale)
 BWV 329 – "Herr, ich denk an jene Zeit" (four-part chorale)
 BWV 330 – "Herr, ich habe missgehandelt" (four-part chorale)
 BWV 331 – "Herr, ich habe missgehandelt" (four-part chorale)
 BWV 332 – "Herr Jesu Christ, dich zu uns wend" (four-part chorale)
 BWV 333 – "Herr Jesu Christ, du hast bereit'" (four-part chorale)
 BWV 334 – "Herr Jesu Christ, ich schrei zu dir" (or) "Herr Jesu Christ, du höchstes Gut" (four-part chorale)
 BWV 335 – "Herr Jesu Christ, meins Lebens Licht" (or) "O Jesu, du mein Bräutigam" (four-part chorale)
 BWV 336 – "Herr Jesu Christ, wahr' Mensch und Gott" (four-part chorale)
 BWV 337 – "Herr, nun lass in Friede" (four-part chorale)
 BWV 338 – "Herr, straf mich nicht in deinem Zorn" (four-part chorale)
 BWV 339 – "Wer in dem Schutz des Höchsten ist" (or) "Herr, wie du willt, so schicks mit mir" (four-part chorale)
 BWV 340 – "Herzlich lieb hab ich dich, o Herr" (four-part chorale)
 BWV 341 – "Heut ist, o Mensch, ein großer Trauertag" (four-part chorale)
 BWV 342 – "Heut triumphieret Gottes Sohn" (four-part chorale)
 BWV 343 – "Hilf, Gott, dass mirs gelinge" (four-part chorale)
 BWV 344 – "Hilf, Herr Jesu, lass gelingen" (four-part chorale)
 BWV 345 – "Ich bin ja, Herr, in deiner Macht" (four-part chorale)
 BWV 346 – "Ich dank dir, Gott, für deine Wohltat" (four-part chorale)
 BWV 347 – "Ich dank dir, lieber Herre" (four-part chorale)
 BWV 348 – "Ich dank dir, lieber Herre" (four-part chorale)
 BWV 349 – "Ich dank dir schon durch deinen Sohn" (four-part chorale)
 BWV 350 – "Ich danke dir, Herr Gott, in deinem Throne" (four-part chorale)
 BWV 351 – "Ich hab mein Sach Gott heimgestellt" (four-part chorale)
 BWV 352 – "Jesu, der du meine Seele" (four-part chorale)
 BWV 353 – "Jesu, der du meine Seele" (four-part chorale)
 BWV 354 – "Jesu, der du meine Seele" (four-part chorale)
 BWV 355 – "Jesu, der du selbsten wohl" (four-part chorale)
 BWV 356 – "Jesu, du mein liebstes Leben" (four-part chorale)
 BWV 357 – "Jesu, Jesu, du bist mein" (four-part chorale)
 BWV 358 – "Jesu, meine Freude" (four-part chorale)
 BWV 359 – "Jesu, meiner Seelen Wonne" (four-part chorale)
 BWV 360 – "Jesu, meiner Seelen Wonne" (four-part chorale)
 BWV 361 – "Jesu, meines Herzens Freud" (four-part chorale)
 BWV 362 – "Jesu, nun sei gepreiset" (four-part chorale)
 BWV 363 – "Jesus Christus, unser Heiland" (four-part chorale)
 BWV 364 – "Jesus Christus, unser Heiland, der den Tod überwand" (four-part chorale)
 BWV 365 – "Jesus, meine Zuversicht" (four-part chorale)
 BWV 366 – "Ihr Gestirn, ihr hohlen Lüfte" (four-part chorale)
 BWV 367 – "In allen meinen Taten" (four-part chorale)
 BWV 368 – "In dulci jubilo" (four-part chorale)
 BWV 369 – "Keinen hat Gott verlassen" (four-part chorale)
 BWV 370 – "Komm, Gott Schöpfer, Heiliger Geist" (four-part chorale)
 BWV 371 – "Kyrie, Gott Vater in Ewigkeit" (four-part chorale)
 BWV 372 – "Lass, o Herr, dein Ohr sich neigen" (four-part chorale)
 BWV 373 – "Liebster Jesu, wir sind hier" (four-part chorale)
 BWV 374 – "Lobet den Herren, denn er ist sehr freundlich" (four-part chorale)
 BWV 375 – "Lobt Gott, ihr Christen, allzugleich" (four-part chorale)
 BWV 376 – "Lobt Gott, ihr Christen allzugleich" (four-part chorale)
 BWV 377 – "Machs mit mir, Gott, nach deiner Güt" (four-part chorale)
 BWV 378 – "Mein Augen schließ ich jetzt in Gottes Namen zu" (four-part chorale)
 BWV 379 – "Meinen Jesum laß ich nicht" (four-part chorale)
 BWV 380 – "Meinen Jesum laß ich nicht" (four-part chorale)
 BWV 381 – "Meines Lebens letzte Zeit" (four-part chorale)
 BWV 382 – "Mit Fried und Freud ich fahr dahin" (four-part chorale)
 BWV 383 – "Mitten wir im Leben sind" (four-part chorale)
 BWV 384 – "Nicht so traurig, nicht so sehr" (four-part chorale)
 BWV 385 – "Nun bitten wir den Heiligen Geist" (four-part chorale)
 BWV 386 – "Nun danket alle Gott" (four-part chorale)
 BWV 387 – "Nun freut euch, Gottes Kinder all" (four-part chorale)
 BWV 388 – "Nun freut euch, lieben Christen gmein" (four-part chorale)
 BWV 389 – "Nun lob, mein Seel, den Herren" (four-part chorale)
 BWV 390 – "Nun lob, mein Seel, den Herren" (four-part chorale)
 BWV 391 – "Nun preiset alle Gottes Barmherzigkeit" (four-part chorale)
 BWV 392 – "Nun ruhen alle Wälder" (four-part chorale)
 BWV 393 – "O Welt, sieh hier dein Leben" (four-part chorale)
 BWV 394 – "O Welt, sieh hier dein Leben" (four-part chorale)
 BWV 395 – "O Welt, sieh hier dein Leben" (four-part chorale)
 BWV 396 – "Nun sich der Tag geendet hat" (four-part chorale)
 BWV 397 – "O Ewigkeit, du Donnerwort" (four-part chorale)
 BWV 398 – "O Gott, du frommer Gott" (four-part chorale)
 BWV 399 – "O Gott, du frommer Gott" (four-part chorale)
 BWV 400 – "O Herzensangst" (four-part chorale)
 BWV 401 – "O Lamm Gottes, unschuldig" (four-part chorale)
 BWV 402 – "O Mensch, bewein dein Sünde groß" (four-part chorale)
 BWV 403 – "O Mensch, schau Jesum Christum an" (four-part chorale)
 BWV 404 – "O Traurigkeit, o Herzeleid" (four-part chorale)
 BWV 405 – "O wie selig seid ihr doch, ihr Frommen" (four-part chorale)
 BWV 406 – "O wie selig seid ihr doch, ihr Frommen" (four-part chorale)
 BWV 407 – "O wir armen Sünder" (four-part chorale)
 BWV 408 – "Schaut, ihr Sünder" (four-part chorale)
 BWV 409 – "Seelenbräutigam" (four-part chorale)
 BWV 410 – "Sei gegrüßet, Jesu gütig" (four-part chorale)
 BWV 411 – "Singt dem Herrn ein neues Lied" (four-part chorale)
 BWV 412 – "So gibst du nun, mein Jesu, gute Nacht" (four-part chorale)
 BWV 413 – "Sollt ich meinem Gott nicht singen" (four-part chorale)
 BWV 414 – "Uns ist ein Kindlein heut geborn" (four-part chorale)
 BWV 415 – "Valet will ich dir geben" (four-part chorale)
 BWV 416 – "Vater unser im Himmelreich" (four-part chorale)
 BWV 417 – "Von Gott will ich nicht lassen" (four-part chorale)
 BWV 418 – "Von Gott will ich nicht lassen" (four-part chorale)
 BWV 419 – "Helft mir Gotts Güte preisen" (or) "Von Gott will ich nicht lassen" (four-part chorale)
 BWV 420 – "Warum betrübst du dich, mein Herz" (four-part chorale)
 BWV 421 – "Warum betrübst du dich, mein Herz" (four-part chorale)
 BWV 422 – "Warum sollt ich mich denn grämen" (four-part chorale)
 BWV 423 – "Was betrübst du dich, mein Herze" (four-part chorale)
 BWV 424 – "Was bist du doch, o Seele, so betrübet" (four-part chorale)
 BWV 425 – "Was willst du dich, o meine Seele, kränken" (four-part chorale)
 BWV 426 – "Weltlich Ehr und zeitlich Gut" (four-part chorale)
 BWV 427 – "Wenn ich in Angst und Not" (four-part chorale)
 BWV 428 – "Wenn mein Stündlein vorhanden ist" (four-part chorale)
 BWV 429 – "Wenn mein Stündlein vorhanden ist" (four-part chorale)
 BWV 430 – "Wenn mein Stündlein verhanden ist" (four-part chorale)
 BWV 431 – "Wenn wir in höchsten Nöten sein" (four-part chorale)
 BWV 432 – "Wenn wir in höchsten Nöten sein" (four-part chorale)
 BWV 433 – "Wer Gott vertraut, hat wohl gebaut" (four-part chorale)
 BWV 434 – "Wer weiß, wie nahe mir mein Ende" (or) "Wer nur den lieben Gott lässt walten" (four-part chorale)
 BWV 435 – "Wie bist du, Seele, in mir so gar betrübt" (four-part chorale)
 BWV 436 – "Wie schön leuchtet der Morgenstern" (four-part chorale)
 BWV 437 – "Wir glauben all an einen Gott" (four-part chorale)
 BWV 438 – "Wo Gott zum Haus nicht gibt sein Gunst" (four-part chorale)
 BWV 439 – "Ach, dass nicht die letzte Stunde" (song/aria)
 BWV 440 – "Auf, auf! die rechte Zeit ist hier" (song/aria)
 BWV 441 – "Auf! auf! mein Herz, mit Freuden" (song/aria)
 BWV 442 – "Beglückter Stand getreuer Seelen" (song/aria)
 BWV 443 – "Beschränkt, ihr Weisen dieser Welt" (song/aria)
 BWV 444 – "Brich entzwei, mein armes Herze" (song/aria)
 BWV 445 – "Brunnquell aller Güter" (song/aria)
 BWV 446 – "Der lieben Sonnen Licht und Pracht" (song/aria)
 BWV 447 – "Der Tag ist hin, die Sonne gehet nieder" (song/aria)
 BWV 448 – "Der Tag mit seinem Lichte" (song/aria)
 BWV 449 – "Dich bet' ich an, mein höchster Gott" (song/aria)
 BWV 450 – "Die bittre Leidenszeit beginnet abermal" (song/aria)
 BWV 451 – "Die goldne Sonne, voll Freud' und Wonne" (song/aria)
 BWV 452 – "Dir, dir Jehovah, will ich singen" (song/aria)
 BWV 453 – "Eins ist Not! ach Herr, dies Eine" (song/aria)
 BWV 454 – "Ermuntre dich, mein schwacher Geist" (song/aria)
 BWV 455 – "Erwürgtes Lamm, das die verwahrten Siegel" (song/aria)
 BWV 456 – "Es glänzet der Christen" (song/aria)
 BWV 457 – "Es ist nun aus mit meinem Leben" (song/aria)
 BWV 458 – "Es ist vollbracht! vergiss ja nicht" (song/aria)
 BWV 459 – "Es kostet viel, ein Christ zu sein" (song/aria)
 BWV 460 – "Gib dich zufrieden und sei stille" (song/aria)
 BWV 461 – "Gott lebet noch; Seele, was verzagst du doch?" (song/aria)
 BWV 462 – "Gott, wie groß ist deine Güte" (song/aria)
 BWV 463 – "Herr, nicht schicke deine Rache" (song/aria)
 BWV 464 – "Ich bin ja, Herr, in deiner Macht" (song/aria)
 BWV 465 – "Ich freue mich in dir" (song/aria)
 BWV 466 – "Ich halte treulich still und liebe" (song/aria)
 BWV 467 – "Ich lass' dich nicht" (song/aria)
 BWV 468 – "Ich liebe Jesum alle Stund'" (song/aria)
 BWV 469 – "Ich steh' an deiner Krippen hier" (song/aria)
 BWV 470 – "Jesu, Jesu, du bist mein" (song/aria)
 BWV 471 – "Jesu, deine Liebeswunden" (song/aria)
 BWV 472 – "Jesu, meines Glaubens Zier" (song/aria)
 BWV 473 – "Jesu, meines Herzens Freud" (song/aria)
 BWV 474 – "Jesus ist das schönste Licht" (song/aria)
 BWV 475 – "Jesus, unser Trost und Leben" (song/aria)
 BWV 476 – "Ihr Gestirn', ihr hohen Lufte" (song/aria)
 BWV 477 – "Kein Stündlein geht dahin" (song/aria)
 BWV 478 – "Komm, süßer Tod, komm, selge Ruh" (song/aria)
 BWV 479 – "Kommt, Seelen, dieser Tag" (song/aria)
 BWV 480 – "Kommt wieder aus der finstern Gruft" (song/aria)
 BWV 481 – "Lasset uns mit Jesu ziehen" (song/aria)
 BWV 482 – "Liebes Herz, bedenke doch" (song/aria)
 BWV 483 – "Liebster Gott, wann werd' ich sterben?" (song/aria)
 BWV 484 – "Liebster Herr Jesu! wo bleibest du so lange?" (song/aria)
 BWV 485 – "Liebster Immanuel, Herzog der Frommen" (song/aria)
 BWV 486 – "Mein Jesu, dem die Seraphinen" (song/aria)
 BWV 487 – "Mein Jesu! was für Seelenweh" (song/aria)
 BWV 488 – "Meines Lebens letzte Zeit" (song/aria)
 BWV 489 – "Nicht so traurig, nicht so sehr" (song/aria)
 BWV 490 – "Nur mein Jesus ist mein Leben" (song/aria)
 BWV 491 – "O du Liebe meiner Liebe" (song/aria)
 BWV 492 – "O finstre Nacht" (song/aria)
 BWV 493 – "O Jesulein süß, o Jesulein mild" (song/aria)
 BWV 494 – "O liebe Seele, zieh' die Sinnen" (song/aria)
 BWV 495 – "O wie selig seid ihr doch, ihr Frommen" (song/aria)
 BWV 496 – "Seelen-Bräutigam, Jesu, Gottes Lamm" (song/aria)
 BWV 497 – "Seelenweide, meine Freude" (song/aria)
 BWV 498 – "Selig, wer an Jesum denkt" (song/aria)
 BWV 499 – "Sei gegrüßet, Jesu gütig" (song/aria)
 BWV 500 – "So gehst du nun, mein Jesu, hin" (song/aria)
 BWV 500a – "So gehst du nun, mein Jesu, hin" (variant of BWV 500 as a four-part chorale)
 BWV 501 – "So giebst du nun, mein Jesu, gute Nacht" (song/aria)
 BWV 502 – "So wünsch' ich mir zu guter Letzt" (song/aria)
 BWV 503 – "Steh' ich bei meinem Gott" (song/aria)
 BWV 504 – "Vergiss mein nicht, dass ich dein nicht" (song/aria)
 BWV 505 – "Vergiss mein nicht, vergiss mein nicht" (song/aria)
 BWV 506 – "Was bist du doch, o Seele, so betrübet" (song/aria)
 BWV 507 – "Wo ist mein Schäflein, das ich liebe" (song/aria)
 BWV 508 – "Bist du bei mir", after Gottfried Heinrich Stölzel (aria)
 BWV 509 – "Gedenke doch, mein Geist" (aria)
 BWV 510 – "Gib dich zufrieden" (chorale)
 BWV 511 – "Gib dich zufrieden" (chorale)
 BWV 512 – "Gib dich zufrieden" (chorale)
 BWV 513 – "O Ewigkeit, du Donnerwort" (chorale)
 BWV 514 – "Schaffs mit mir, Gott" (chorale)
 BWV 515 – "So oft ich meine Tobackspfeife" (aria)
 BWV 515a – "So oft ich meine Tobackspfeife" (variant of BWV 515)
 BWV 516 – "Warum betrübst du dich" (aria)
 BWV 517 – "Wie wohl ist mir, o Freund der Seelen" (song/aria)
 BWV 518 – "Willst du dein Herz mir schenken" (song/aria)
 BWV 519 – "Hier lieg ich nun" (song/aria)
 BWV 520 – "Das walt' mein Gott" (song/aria)
 BWV 521 – "Gott mein Herz dir Dank" (song/aria)
 BWV 522 – "Meine Seele, lass es gehen" (song/aria)
 BWV 523 – "Ich gnüge mich an meinem Stande" (song/aria)
 BWV 524 – Wedding Quodlibet (fragment)
 BWV 525 – Organ Sonata No. 1 in E-flat major
 BWV 525a (or: BWV deest) – Concerto (or: Trio Sonata) in C major for violin, cello and continuo (variant of BWV 525/1, 1032/2 and 525/3)
 BWV 526 – Organ Sonata No. 2 in C minor
 BWV 527 – Organ Sonata No. 3 in D minor
 BWV 528 – Organ Sonata No. 4 in E minor
 BWV 529 – Organ Sonata No. 5 in C major
 BWV 530 – Organ Sonata No. 6 in G major
 BWV 531 – Prelude and Fugue in C major
 BWV 532:
 BWV 532.1 (previously 532/2a) – Fugue in D major (early version of the fugue of BWV 532)
 BWV 532.2 (previously 532) – Prelude and Fugue in D major
 BWV 533 – Prelude and Fugue in E minor ("Cathedral")
 BWV 533a – Prelude and Fugue in E minor (alternative version of BWV 533 without pedals)
 BWV 534 – Prelude and Fugue in F minor
 BWV 535 – Prelude and Fugue in G minor
 BWV 535a – Prelude and Fugue in G minor (alternative version of BWV 535)
 BWV 536 – Prelude and Fugue in A major
 BWV 536a – Prelude and Fugue in A major (incomplete variant of BWV 536)
 BWV 537 – Fantasia and Fugue in C minor
 BWV 538 – Toccata and Fugue in D minor ("Dorian")
 BWV 539 – Prelude and Fugue in D minor ("Fiddle"; Fugue exists in a variants for violin and for lute, see BWV 1001/2 and 1000 respectively)
 BWV 540 – Toccata and Fugue in F major
 BWV 541 – Prelude and Fugue in G major
 BWV 542 – Fantasia and Fugue in G minor ("Great")
 BWV 543 – Prelude and Fugue in A minor
 BWV 543/1a – Prelude in A minor (early version of the prelude of BWV 543)
 BWV 544 – Prelude and Fugue in B minor
 BWV 545 – Prelude and Fugue in C major
 BWV 545a – Prelude and Fugue in C major (early version of BWV 545)
 BWV 545b – Prelude, Trio and Fugue in B-flat major (outer movements variant of BWV 545(a); middle movement variant of BWV 1029/3)
 BWV 546 – Prelude and Fugue in C minor
 BWV 547 – Prelude and Fugue in C major ("9/8")
 BWV 548 – Prelude and Fugue in E minor ("Wedge")
 BWV 549 – Prelude and Fugue in C minor
 BWV 550 – Prelude and Fugue in G major
 BWV 551 – Prelude and Fugue in A minor
 BWV 552 – Prelude and Fugue in E-flat major ("St. Anne")
 BWV 553 – Eight Short Preludes and Fugues No. 1: Prelude and Fugue in C major
 BWV 554 – Eight Short Preludes and Fugues No. 2: Prelude and Fugue in D minor
 BWV 555 – Eight Short Preludes and Fugues No. 3: Prelude and Fugue in E minor
 BWV 556 – Eight Short Preludes and Fugues No. 4: Prelude and Fugue in F major
 BWV 557 – Eight Short Preludes and Fugues No. 5: Prelude and Fugue in G major
 BWV 558 – Eight Short Preludes and Fugues No. 6: Prelude and Fugue in G minor
 BWV 559 – Eight Short Preludes and Fugues No. 7: Prelude and Fugue in A minor
 BWV 560 – Eight Short Preludes and Fugues No. 8: Prelude and Fugue in B-flat major
 BWV 561 – Fantasia and Fugue in A minor
 BWV 562 – Fantasia and Fugue in C minor (fugue unfinished)
 BWV 563 – Fantasia (and Imitatio) in B minor
 BWV 564 – Toccata, Adagio and Fugue in C major
 BWV 565 – Toccata and Fugue in D minor
 BWV 566 – Toccata and Fugue in E major (earliest extant manuscripts present this work in C major)
 BWV 567 – Prelude in C major
 BWV 568 – Prelude in G major
 BWV 569 – Prelude in A minor
 BWV 570 – Fantasia in C major
 BWV 571 – Fantasia (Concerto) in G major
 BWV 572 – Fantasia in G major (Pièce d'Orgue)
 BWV 573 – Fantasia in C major (incomplete)
 BWV 574 – Fugue in C minor (on a theme of Legrenzi)
 BWV 574a – Fugue in C minor (alternative version of BWV 574)
 BWV 574b – Fugue in C minor (alternative version of BWV 574)
 BWV 575 – Fugue in C minor
 BWV 576 – Fugue in G major
 BWV 577 – Fugue in G major ("à la Gigue")
 BWV 578 – Fugue in G minor ("Little")
 BWV 579 – Fugue in B minor (on a theme from Arcangelo Corelli's Op. 3, No. 4)
 BWV 580 – Fugue in D major
 BWV 581 – Fugue in G major
 BWV 582 – Passacaglia and Fugue in C minor
 BWV 583 – Trio in D minor
 BWV 584 – Trio in G minor (variant of BWV 166/2)
 BWV 585 – Trio in C minor (after Johann Friedrich Fasch)
 BWV 586 – Trio in G major
 BWV 587 – Aria in F major (after François Couperin)
 BWV 588 – Canzona in D minor
 BWV 589 – Alla breve in D major
 BWV 590 – Pastorella in F major
 BWV 591 – Little Harmonic Labyrinth
 BWV 592 – Concerto in G major, after Violin Concerto a 8 in G major by Prince Johann Ernst of Saxe-Weimar
 BWV 592a – Concerto in G major (arrangement of BWV 592 for harpsichord)
 BWV 593 – Concerto in A minor, after Antonio Vivaldi's Concerto in A minor for two violins and strings, Op. 3 No. 8 (RV 522)
 BWV 594 – Concerto in C major, after Antonio Vivaldi's Grosso Mogul Violin Concerto in D major, RV 208
 BWV 595 – Concerto in C major (arrangement for organ of the first movement of BWV 984)
 BWV 596 – Concerto in D minor, after Antonio Vivaldi's Concerto in D minor for two violins, cello and strings, Op. 3 No. 11 (RV 565)
 BWV 597 – Concerto in E-flat major
 BWV 598 – Pedal Exercise in G minor
 BWV 599 – Nun komm, der Heiden Heiland (chorale prelude No. 1 from Orgelbüchlein)
 BWV 600 – Gott, durch deine Güte (or) Gottes Sohn ist kommen (chorale prelude No. 2 from Orgelbüchlein)
 BWV 601 – Herr Christ, der einge Gottessohn (or) Herr Gott, nun sei gepreiset (chorale prelude No. 3 from Orgelbüchlein; also in the Neumeister Collection)
 BWV 602 – Lob sei dem allmächtigen Gott (chorale prelude No. 4 from Orgelbüchlein)
 BWV 603 – Puer natus in Bethlehem (chorale prelude No. 5 from Orgelbüchlein)
 BWV 604 – Gelobet seist du, Jesu Christ (chorale prelude No. 6 from Orgelbüchlein)
 BWV 605 – Der Tag, der ist so freudenreich (chorale prelude No. 7 from Orgelbüchlein)
 BWV 606 – Vom Himmel hoch, da komm ich her (chorale prelude No. 8 from Orgelbüchlein)
 BWV 607 – Vom Himmel kam der Engel Schar (chorale prelude No. 9 from Orgelbüchlein)
 BWV 608 – In dulci jubilo (chorale prelude No. 10 from Orgelbüchlein)
 BWV 609 – Lobt Gott, ihr Christen, allzugleich (chorale prelude No. 11 from Orgelbüchlein)
 BWV 610 – Jesu, meine Freude (chorale prelude No. 12 from Orgelbüchlein)
 BWV 611 – Christum wir sollen loben schon (chorale prelude No. 13 from Orgelbüchlein)
 BWV 612 – Wir Christenleut' (chorale prelude No. 14 from Orgelbüchlein)
 BWV 613 – Helft mir Gottes Güte preisen (chorale prelude No. 15 from Orgelbüchlein)
 BWV 614 – Das alte Jahr vergangen ist (chorale prelude No. 16 from Orgelbüchlein)
 BWV 615 – In dir ist Freude (chorale prelude No. 17 from Orgelbüchlein)
 BWV 616 – Mit Fried und Freud ich fahr dahin (chorale prelude No. 18 from Orgelbüchlein)
 BWV 617 – Herr Gott, nun schleuß den Himmel auf (chorale prelude No. 19 from Orgelbüchlein)
 BWV 618 – O Lamm Gottes, unschuldig (chorale prelude No. 20 from Orgelbüchlein)
 BWV 619 – Christe, du Lamm Gottes (chorale prelude No. 21 from Orgelbüchlein)
 BWV 620 – Christus, der uns selig macht (chorale prelude No. 22 from Orgelbüchlein)
 BWV 620a – Christus, der uns selig macht (earlier version of BWV 620)
 BWV 621 – Da Jesus an dem Kreuze stund (chorale prelude No. 23 from Orgelbüchlein)
 BWV 622 – O Mensch, bewein dein Sünde groß (chorale prelude No. 24 from Orgelbüchlein)
 BWV 623 – Wir danken dir, Herr Jesu Christ (chorale prelude No. 25 from Orgelbüchlein)
 BWV 624 – Hilf Gott, daß mir's gelinge (chorale prelude No. 26 from Orgelbüchlein)
 BWV 625 – Christ lag in Todesbanden (chorale prelude No. 27 from Orgelbüchlein)
 BWV 626 – Jesus Christus, unser Heiland (chorale prelude No. 28 from Orgelbüchlein)
 BWV 627 – Christ ist erstanden (chorale prelude No. 29 from Orgelbüchlein)
 BWV 628 – Erstanden ist der heil'ge Christ (chorale prelude No. 30 from Orgelbüchlein)
 BWV 629 – Erschienen ist der herrliche Tag (chorale prelude No. 31 from Orgelbüchlein)
 BWV 630 – Heut triumphieret Gottes Sohn (chorale prelude No. 32 from Orgelbüchlein)
 BWV 631 – Komm, Gott Schöpfer, Heiliger Geist (chorale prelude No. 33 from Orgelbüchlein)
 BWV 631a – Komm, Gott Schöpfer, Heiliger Geist (earlier version of BWV 631)
 BWV 632 – Herr Jesu Christ, dich zu uns wend' (chorale prelude No. 34 from Orgelbüchlein)
 BWV 633 – Liebster Jesu, wir sind hier (chorale prelude No. 36 from Orgelbüchlein)
 BWV 634 – Liebster Jesu, wir sind hier (chorale prelude No. 35 from Orgelbüchlein, earlier version of BWV 633)
 BWV 635 – Dies sind die heil'gen zehn Gebot' (chorale prelude No. 37 from Orgelbüchlein)
 BWV 636 – Vater unser im Himmelreich (chorale prelude No. 38 from Orgelbüchlein)
 BWV 637 – Durch Adams Fall ist ganz verderbt (chorale prelude No. 39 from Orgelbüchlein)
 BWV 638 – Es ist das Heil uns kommen her (chorale prelude No. 40 from Orgelbüchlein)
 BWV 638a – Es ist das Heil uns kommen her (earlier version of BWV 638)
 BWV 639 – Ich ruf zu dir, Herr Jesu Christ (chorale prelude No. 41 from Orgelbüchlein; also in the Neumeister Collection)
 BWV 640 – In dich hab ich gehoffet, Herr (chorale prelude No. 42 from Orgelbüchlein)
 BWV 641 – Wenn wir in höchsten Nöten sein (chorale prelude No. 43 from Orgelbüchlein)
 BWV 642 – Wer nur den lieben Gott läßt walten (chorale prelude No. 44 from Orgelbüchlein)
 BWV 643 – Alle Menschen müssen sterben (chorale prelude No. 45 from Orgelbüchlein)
 BWV 644 – Ach wie nichtig, ach wie flüchtig (chorale prelude No. 46 from Orgelbüchlein)
 BWV 645 – Wachet auf, ruft uns die Stimme (Schübler Chorales No. 1)
 BWV 646 – Wo soll ich fliehen hin (or) Auf meinen lieben Gott (Schübler Chorales No. 2)
 BWV 647 – Wer nur den lieben Gott läßt walten (Schübler Chorales No. 3)
 BWV 648 – Meine Seele erhebt den Herren (Schübler Chorales No. 4)
 BWV 649 – Ach, bleib bei uns, Herr Jesu Christ (Schübler Chorales No. 5)
 BWV 650 – Kommst du nun, Jesu, vom Himmel herunter (Schübler Chorales No. 6)
 BWV 651 – Fantasia super "Komm, Heiliger Geist, Herre Gott" (Great Eighteen Chorale Preludes No. 1)
 BWV 651a – Fantasia (Präludium) super "Komm, Heiliger Geist, Herre Gott" (earlier version of BWV 651)
 BWV 652 – Komm, Heiliger Geist, Herre Gott (Great Eighteen Chorale Preludes No. 2)
 BWV 652a – Komm, Heiliger Geist, Herre Gott (earlier version of BWV 652)
 BWV 653 – An Wasserflüssen Babylon (Great Eighteen Chorale Preludes No. 3)
 BWV 653a – An Wasserflüssen Babylon, alio modo a 4 (earlier version of BWV 653)
 BWV 653b – An Wasserflüssen Babylon (earlier version of BWV 653a)
 BWV 654 – Schmücke dich, o liebe Seele (Great Eighteen Chorale Preludes No. 4)
 BWV 654a – Schmücke dich, o liebe Seele (earlier version of BWV 654)
 BWV 655 – Trio super "Herr Jesu Christ, dich zu uns wend'" (Great Eighteen Chorale Preludes No. 5)
 BWV 655a – Trio super "Herr Jesu Christ, dich zu uns wend'" (earlier version of BWV 655)
 BWV 655b (or: BWV deest) – Herr Jesu Christ, dich zu uns wend' (likely spurious variant of BWV 655)
 BWV 655c (or: BWV deest) – Herr Jesu Christ, dich zu uns wend' (likely spurious variant of BWV 655)
 BWV 656 – O Lamm Gottes, unschuldig (Great Eighteen Chorale Preludes No. 6)
 BWV 656a – O Lamm Gottes, unschuldig (earlier version of BWV 656)
 BWV 657 – Nun danket alle Gott (Great Eighteen Chorale Preludes No. 7)
 BWV 658 – Von Gott will ich nicht lassen (Great Eighteen Chorale Preludes No. 8)
 BWV 658a – Fantasia super "Von Gott will ich nicht lassen3 (earlier version of BWV 658)
 BWV 659 – Nun komm, der Heiden Heiland (Great Eighteen Chorale Preludes No. 9)
 BWV 659a – Fantasia super "Nun komm, der Heiden Heiland" (earlier version of BWV 659)
 BWV 660 – Trio super "Nun komm, der Heiden Heiland" (Great Eighteen Chorale Preludes No. 10)
 BWV 660a – Nun komm, der Heiden Heiland (earlier version of BWV 660)
 BWV 660b – Nun komm, der Heiden Heiland (variant of BWV 660)
 BWV 661 – Nun komm, der Heiden Heiland (Great Eighteen Chorale Preludes No. 11)
 BWV 661a – Nun komm, der Heiden Heiland (earlier version of BWV 661)
 BWV 662 – Allein Gott in der Höh' sei Ehr' (Great Eighteen Chorale Preludes No. 12)
 BWV 662a – Allein Gott in der Höh' sei Ehr' (earlier version of BWV 662)
 BWV 663 – Allein Gott in der Höh' sei Ehr' (Great Eighteen Chorale Preludes No. 13)
 BWV 663a – Allein Gott in der Höh' sei Ehr' (earlier version of BWV 663)
 BWV 664 – Trio super "Allein Gott in der Höh' sei Ehr'" (Great Eighteen Chorale Preludes No. 14)
 BWV 664a – Trio super "Allein Gott in der Höh' sei Ehr'" (earlier version of BWV 664)
 BWV 664b – Trio super "Allein Gott in der Höh' sei Ehr'" (earlier sketch for BWV 664a)
 BWV 665 – Jesus Christus, unser Heiland (Great Eighteen Chorale Preludes No. 15)
 BWV 665a – Jesus Christus, unser Heiland, in organo pleno (earlier version of BWV 665)
 BWV 666 – Jesus Christus, unser Heiland, alio modo (Great Eighteen Chorale Preludes No. 16)
 BWV 666a – Jesus Christus, unser Heiland (earlier version of BWV 666)
 BWV 667 – Komm, Gott Schöpfer, heiliger Geist (Great Eighteen Chorale Preludes No. 17)
 BWV 667a – Komm, Gott Schöpfer, heiliger Geist (earlier version of BWV 667)
 BWV 667b – Komm, Gott Schöpfer, heiliger Geist (earlier sketch for BWV 667a)
 BWV 668 – Vor deinen Thron tret' ich (fragment; Great Eighteen Chorale Preludes No. 18)
 BWV 668a – Wenn wir in höchsten Nöten sein (variant of BWV 668)
 BWV 669 – Kyrie, Gott Vater in Ewigkeit (chorale prelude: large version, i.e. with pedal)
 BWV 670 – Christe, aller Welt Trost (chorale prelude: large version)
 BWV 671 – Kyrie, Gott heiliger Geist (chorale prelude: large version) 
 BWV 672 – Kyrie, Gott Vater in Ewigkeit (chorale prelude: small version, i.e. for single keyboard)
 BWV 673 – Christe, aller Welt Trost (chorale prelude: small version) 
 BWV 674 – Kyrie, Gott heiliger Geist (chorale prelude: small version)
 BWV 675 – Allein Gott in der Höh' sei Ehr' (chorale prelude)
 BWV 676 – Allein Gott in der Höh' sei Ehr' (chorale prelude: large version)
 BWV 676a – Allein Gott in der Höh' sei Ehr' (later variant of BWV 676)
 BWV 677 – Fughetta super "Allein Gott in der Höh' sei Ehr'" (chorale prelude: small version)
 BWV 678 – Dies sind die heil'gen zehn Gebot' (chorale prelude: large version)
 BWV 679 – Fughetta super "Dies sind die heil'gen zehn Gebot'" (chorale prelude: small version)
 BWV 680 – Wir glauben all an einen Gott (chorale prelude: large version)
 BWV 681 – Fughetta super "Wir glauben all an einen Gott" (chorale prelude: small version)
 BWV 682 – Vater unser im Himmelreich (chorale prelude: large version)
 BWV 683 – Vater unser im Himmelreich (chorale prelude: small version)
 BWV 683a – Vater unser im Himmelreich (later variant of BWV 683)
 BWV 684 – Christ unser Herr zum Jordan kam (chorale prelude: large version)
 BWV 685 – Christ unser Herr zum Jordan kam alio modo (chorale prelude: small version)
 BWV 686 – Aus tiefer Not schrei ich zu dir (chorale prelude: large version)
 BWV 687 – Aus tiefer Not schrei ich zu dir (chorale prelude: small version)
 BWV 688 – Jesus Christus, unser Heiland, der von uns den Zorn Gottes wandt (chorale prelude: large version)
 BWV 689 – Fuga super "Jesus Christus, unser Heiland" (chorale prelude: small version)
 BWV 690 – Wer nur den lieben Gott läßt walten (chorale prelude from the Kirnberger collection)
 BWV 691 – Wer nur den lieben Gott läßt walten (chorale prelude from the Kirnberger collection)
 BWV 691a – Wer nur den lieben Gott läßt walten (variant of BWV 691)
 BWV 692 – Ach, Gott und Herr (chorale prelude from the Kirnberger collection)
 BWV 692a – Ach, Gott und Herr (variant of BWV 692)
 BWV 693 – Ach, Gott und Herr (chorale prelude from the Kirnberger collection)
 BWV 694 – Wo soll ich fliehen hin (chorale prelude from the Kirnberger collection)
 BWV 695 – Fantasia super "Christ lag in Todesbanden" (chorale prelude from the Kirnberger collection)
 BWV 695a – Fantasia super "Christ lag in Todesbanden" (variant of BWV 695)
 BWV 696 – Fughetta super "Christum wir sollen loben schon" (chorale prelude from the Kirnberger collection)
 BWV 697 – Fughetta super "Gelobet seist du, Jesu Christ" (chorale prelude from the Kirnberger collection)
 BWV 698 – Fughetta super "Herr Christ, der ein'ge Gottes-Sohn" (chorale prelude from the Kirnberger collection)
 BWV 699 – Fughetta super "Nun komm, der Heiden Heiland" (chorale prelude from the Kirnberger collection)
 BWV 700 – Vom Himmel hoch, da komm' ich her (chorale prelude from the Kirnberger collection)
 BWV 701 – Fughetta super "Vom Himmel hoch, da komm' ich her" (chorale prelude from the Kirnberger collection)
 BWV 702 – Fughetta super "Das Jesulein soll doch mein Trost" (chorale prelude from the Kirnberger collection)
 BWV 703 – Fughetta super "Gottes-Sohn ist kommen" (chorale prelude from the Kirnberger collection)
 BWV 704 – Fughetta super "Lob sei dem allmächtigen Gott" (chorale prelude from the Kirnberger collection)
 BWV 705 – Durch Adams Fall ist ganz verderbt (chorale prelude from the Kirnberger collection)
 BWV 706 – Liebster Jesu, wir sind hier (two versions; chorale prelude from the Kirnberger collection)
 BWV 707 – Ich hab' mein' Sach' Gott heimgestellt (chorale prelude from the Kirnberger collection)
 BWV 708 – Ich hab' mein' Sach' Gott heimgestellt alio modo (chorale prelude from the Kirnberger collection)
 BWV 708a – Ich hab' mein' Sach' Gott heimgestellt (variant of BWV 708)
 BWV 709 – Herr Jesu Christ, dich zu uns wend' (chorale prelude from the Kirnberger collection)
 BWV 710 – Wir Christenleut' (chorale prelude from the Kirnberger collection)
 BWV 711 – Allein Gott in der Höh' sei Ehr' (bicinium; chorale prelude from the Kirnberger collection)
 BWV 712 – In dich hab' ich gehoffet (chorale prelude from the Kirnberger collection)
 BWV 713 – Fantasia super "Jesu, meine Freude" (chorale prelude from the Kirnberger collection)
 BWV 713a – Fantasia super "Jesu, meine Freude" (variant of BWV 713)
 BWV 714 – Ach Gott und Herr (chorale prelude; also in the Neumeister Collection)
 BWV 715 – Allein Gott in der Höh sei Ehr (chorale prelude)
 BWV 716 – Fuga super "Allein Gott in der Höh sei Ehr" (chorale prelude)
 BWV 717 – Allein Gott in der Höh sei Ehr' (chorale prelude)
 BWV 718 – Christ lag in Todesbanden (chorale prelude)
 BWV 719 – Der Tag, der ist so freudenreich (chorale prelude; also in the Neumeister Collection)
 BWV 720 – Ein feste Burg ist unser Gott (chorale prelude)
 BWV 721 – Erbarm dich mein, o Herre Gott (chorale prelude)
 BWV 722 – Gelobet seist du, Jesu Christ (chorale prelude)
 BWV 722a – Gelobet seist du, Jesu Christ (sketch; variant of BWV 722)
 BWV 723 – Gelobet seist du, Jesu Christ (chorale prelude)
 BWV 724 – Gott, durch deine Güte (or) Gottes Sohn ist kommen (chorale prelude)
 BWV 725 – Herr Gott, dich loben wir (chorale prelude)
 BWV 726 – Herr Jesu Christ, dich zu uns wend (chorale prelude)
 BWV 727 – Herzlich tut mich verlangen (chorale prelude)
 BWV 728 – Jesus, meine Zuversicht (chorale prelude)
 BWV 729 – In dulci jubilo (chorale prelude)
 BWV 729a – In dulci jubilo (sketch; variant of BWV 729)
 BWV 730 – Liebster Jesu, wir sind hier (chorale prelude)
 BWV 731 – Liebster Jesu, wir sind hier (chorale prelude)
 BWV 732 – Lobt Gott, ihr Christen, allzugleich (chorale prelude)
 BWV 732a – Lobt Gott, ihr Christen, allzugleich (sketch; variant of BWV 732)
 BWV 733 – Fuga sopra il Magnificat (chorale prelude)
 BWV 734 – Nun freut euch, lieben Christen (or) Es ist gewisslich an der Zeit (chorale prelude)
 BWV 735 – Valet will ich dir geben (chorale prelude)
 BWV 736 – Valet will ich dir geben (chorale prelude)
 BWV 737 – Vater unser im Himmelreich  (chorale prelude; also in the Neumeister Collection)
 BWV 738 – Von Himmel hoch, da komm' ich her (chorale prelude)
 BWV 738a – Von Himmel hoch, da komm' ich her (sketch; variant of BWV 738)
 BWV 739 – Wie schön leuchtet der Morgenstern (chorale prelude)
 BWV 740 – Wir glauben all' an einen Gott, Vater (chorale prelude)
 BWV 741 – Ach Gott, von Himmel sieh' darein (chorale prelude)
 BWV 742 – Ach Herr, mich armen Sünder (chorale prelude; also in the Neumeister Collection)
 BWV 743 – Ach, was ist doch unser Leben (chorale prelude)
 BWV 744 – Auf meinen lieben Gott (chorale prelude)
 BWV 745 – Aus der Tiefe rufe ich (chorale prelude)
 BWV 746 – Christ ist erstanden (chorale prelude)
 BWV 747 – Christus, der uns selig macht (chorale prelude)
 BWV 748 – Gott der Vater wohn' uns bei (chorale prelude)
 BWV 748a – Gott der Vater wohn' uns bei (variant of BWV 748)
 BWV 749 – Herr Jesu Christ, dich zu uns wend' (chorale prelude)
 BWV 750 – Herr Jesu Christ, mein's Lebens Licht (chorale prelude)
 BWV 751 – In dulci jubilo (chorale prelude)
 BWV 752 – Jesu, der du meine Seele (chorale prelude)
 BWV 753 – Jesu, meine Freude (chorale prelude; fragment)
 BWV 754 – Liebster Jesu, wir sind hier (chorale prelude)
 BWV 755 – Nun freut euch, lieben Christen (chorale prelude)
 BWV 756 – Nun ruhen alle Wälder (chorale prelude)
 BWV 757 – O Herre Gott, dein göttlich's Wort (chorale prelude)
 BWV 758 – O Vater, allmächtiger Gott (chorale prelude)
 BWV 759 – Schmücke dich, o liebe Seele (chorale prelude)
 BWV 760 – Vater unser im Himmelreich (chorale prelude)
 BWV 761 – Vater unser im Himmelreich (chorale prelude)
 BWV 762 – Vater unser im Himmelreich (chorale prelude)
 BWV 763 – Wie schön leuchtet der Morgenstern (chorale prelude)
 BWV 764 – Wie schön leuchtet der Morgenstern (chorale prelude; fragment)
 BWV 765 – Wir glauben all' an einen Gott (chorale prelude)
 BWV 766 – Christ, der du bist der helle Tag (chorale partita)
 BWV 767 – O Gott, du frommer Gott (chorale partita)
 BWV 768 – Sei gegrüsset, Jesu gütig (chorale partita)
 BWV 769 – Canonic Variations on "Vom Himmel hoch da komm' ich her" (as published by the composer)
 BWV 769a – Canonic Variations on "Vom Himmel hoch da komm' ich her" (manuscript variant of BWV 769)
 BWV 770 – Ach, was soll ich Sünder machen (chorale variations)
 BWV 771 – Allein Gott in der Höh' sei Ehr' (chorale variations)
 BWV 772 – Two-Part Invention No. 1 in C major
 BWV 772a – Two-Part Invention in C major (variant of BWV 772)
 BWV 773 – Two-Part Invention No. 2 in C minor
 BWV 774 – Two-Part Invention No. 3 in D major
 BWV 775 – Two-Part Invention No. 4 in D minor
 BWV 776 – Two-Part Invention No. 5 in E-flat major
 BWV 777 – Two-Part Invention No. 6 in E major
 BWV 778 – Two-Part Invention No. 7 in E minor
 BWV 779 – Two-Part Invention No. 8 in F major
 BWV 780 – Two-Part Invention No. 9 in F minor
 BWV 781 – Two-Part Invention No. 10 in G major
 BWV 782 – Two-Part Invention No. 11 in G minor
 BWV 783 – Two-Part Invention No. 12 in A major
 BWV 784 – Two-Part Invention No. 13 in A minor
 BWV 785 – Two-Part Invention No. 14 in B-flat major
 BWV 786 – Two-Part Invention No. 15 in B minor
 BWV 787 – Sinfonia No. 1 in C major
 BWV 788 – Sinfonia No. 2 in C minor
 BWV 789 – Sinfonia No. 3 in D major
 BWV 790 – Sinfonia No. 4 in D minor
 BWV 791 – Sinfonia No. 5 in E-flat major
 BWV 792 – Sinfonia No. 6 in E major
 BWV 793 – Sinfonia No. 7 in E minor
 BWV 794 – Sinfonia No. 8 in F major
 BWV 795 – Sinfonia No. 9 in F minor
 BWV 796 – Sinfonia No. 10 in G major
 BWV 797 – Sinfonia No. 11 in G minor
 BWV 798 – Sinfonia No. 12 in A major
 BWV 799 – Sinfonia No. 13 in A minor
 BWV 800 – Sinfonia No. 14 in B-flat major
 BWV 801 – Sinfonia No. 15 in B minor
 BWV 802 – Duet in E minor
 BWV 803 – Duet in F major
 BWV 804 – Duet in G major
 BWV 805 – Duet in A minor
 BWV 806 – English Suite No. 1 in A major
 BWV 806a – Suite in A major (variant of BWV 806)
 BWV 807 – English Suite No. 2 in A minor
 BWV 808 – English Suite No. 3 in G minor
 BWV 809 – English Suite No. 4 in F major
 BWV 810 – English Suite No. 5 in E minor
 BWV 811 – English Suite No. 6 in D minor
 BWV 812 – French Suite No. 1 in D minor
 BWV 813 – French Suite No. 2 in C minor
 BWV 813a – French Suite No. 2 in C minor (alternative version of movement 5: Menuet)
 BWV 814 – French Suite No. 3 in B minor
 BWV 815 – French Suite No. 4 in E-flat major
 BWV 815a – French Suite No. 4 in E-flat major (alternative versions of several movements)
 BWV 816 – French Suite No. 5 in G major
 BWV 817 – French Suite No. 6 in E major
 BWV 818 – Suite in A minor
 BWV 818a – Suite in A minor (alternative version of BWV 818)
 BWV 819 – Suite in E-flat major
 BWV 819a – Suite in E-flat major (alternative version of movement 1: Allemande from BWV 819)
 BWV 820 – Overture (Suite) in F major
 BWV 821 – Suite in B-flat major
 BWV 822 – Suite in G minor
 BWV 823 – Suite in F minor
 BWV 824 – Suite in A major
 BWV 825 – Partita No. 1 in B-flat major
 BWV 826 – Partita No. 2 in C minor
 BWV 827 – Partita No. 3 in A minor
 BWV 828 – Partita No. 4 in D major
 BWV 829 – Partita No. 5 in G major
 BWV 830 – Partita No. 6 in E minor
 BWV 831 – Overture in the French Style, in B minor
 BWV 831a – Earlier version in C minor of BWV 831
 BWV 832 – Suite in A major
 BWV 833 – Prelude and Partita in F major
 BWV 834 – Allemande in C minor
 BWV 835 – Allemande in A minor
 BWV 836 – Allemande in G minor
 BWV 837 – Allemande in G minor (incomplete)
 BWV 838 – Allemande and Courante in A major
 BWV 839 – Sarabande in G minor
 BWV 840 – Courante in G major
 BWV 841 – Minuet in G major
 BWV 842 – Minuet in G minor
 BWV 843 – Minuet in G major
 BWV 844 – Scherzo in D minor
 BWV 844a – Scherzo in D minor (alternative version of BWV 844)
 BWV 845 – Gigue in F minor
 BWV 846 – Well-Tempered Clavier, Book 1: Prelude and Fugue No. 1 in C major
 BWV 846a – Prelude in C major (alternative version of BWV 846, only Prelude)
 BWV 847 – Well-Tempered Clavier, Book 1: Prelude and Fugue No. 2 in C minor
 BWV 847a – Prelude in C minor (alternative version of BWV 847, only Prelude)
 BWV 848 – Well-Tempered Clavier, Book 1: Prelude and Fugue No. 3 in C-sharp major
 BWV 849 – Well-Tempered Clavier, Book 1: Prelude and Fugue No. 4 in C-sharp minor
 BWV 850 – Well-Tempered Clavier, Book 1: Prelude and Fugue No. 5 in D major
 BWV 850a – Prelude in D major (alternative version of BWV 850, only Prelude)
 BWV 851 – Well-Tempered Clavier, Book 1: Prelude and Fugue No. 6 in D minor
 BWV 851a – Prelude in D minor (alternative version of BWV 851, only Prelude)
 BWV 852 – Well-Tempered Clavier, Book 1: Prelude and Fugue No. 7 in E-flat major
 BWV 853 – Well-Tempered Clavier, Book 1: Prelude and Fugue No. 8 in E-flat minor/D-sharp minor
 BWV 854 – Well-Tempered Clavier, Book 1: Prelude and Fugue No. 9 in E major
 BWV 855 – Well-Tempered Clavier, Book 1: Prelude and Fugue No. 10 in E minor
 BWV 855a – Prelude in E minor (early version of the prelude of BWV 855) + Fughetta
 BWV 856 – Well-Tempered Clavier, Book 1: Prelude and Fugue No. 11 in F major
 BWV 857 – Well-Tempered Clavier, Book 1: Prelude and Fugue No. 12 in F minor
 BWV 858 – Well-Tempered Clavier, Book 1: Prelude and Fugue No. 13 in F-sharp major
 BWV 859 – Well-Tempered Clavier, Book 1: Prelude and Fugue No. 14 in F-sharp minor
 BWV 860 – Well-Tempered Clavier, Book 1: Prelude and Fugue No. 15 in G major
 BWV 861 – Well-Tempered Clavier, Book 1: Prelude and Fugue No. 16 in G minor
 BWV 862 – Well-Tempered Clavier, Book 1: Prelude and Fugue No. 17 in A-flat major
 BWV 863 – Well-Tempered Clavier, Book 1: Prelude and Fugue No. 18 in G-sharp minor
 BWV 864 – Well-Tempered Clavier, Book 1: Prelude and Fugue No. 19 in A major
 BWV 865 – Well-Tempered Clavier, Book 1: Prelude and Fugue No. 20 in A minor
 BWV 866 – Well-Tempered Clavier, Book 1: Prelude and Fugue No. 21 in B-flat major
 BWV 867 – Well-Tempered Clavier, Book 1: Prelude and Fugue No. 22 in B-flat minor
 BWV 868 – Well-Tempered Clavier, Book 1: Prelude and Fugue No. 23 in B major
 BWV 869 – Well-Tempered Clavier, Book 1: Prelude and Fugue No. 24 in B minor
 BWV 870 – Well-Tempered Clavier, Book 2: Prelude and Fugue No. 1 in C major
 BWV 870a – Prelude and Fugue in C major (alternative version of BWV 870)
 BWV 870b – Prelude in C major (alternative version of BWV 870)
 BWV 871 – Well-Tempered Clavier, Book 2: Prelude and Fugue No. 2 in C minor
 BWV 872 – Well-Tempered Clavier, Book 2: Prelude and Fugue No. 3 in C-sharp major
 BWV 872a – Prelude and Fugue in C-sharp major (alternative version of BWV 872)
 BWV 873 – Well-Tempered Clavier, Book 2: Prelude and Fugue No. 4 in C-sharp minor
 BWV 874 – Well-Tempered Clavier, Book 2: Prelude and Fugue No. 5 in D major
 BWV 875 – Well-Tempered Clavier, Book 2: Prelude and Fugue No. 6 in D minor
 BWV 875a – Prelude in D minor (alternative version of BWV 875)
 BWV 876 – Well-Tempered Clavier, Book 2: Prelude and Fugue No. 7 in E-flat major
 BWV 877 – Well-Tempered Clavier, Book 2: Prelude and Fugue No. 8 in D-sharp minor
 BWV 878 – Well-Tempered Clavier, Book 2: Prelude and Fugue No. 9 in E major
 BWV 879 – Well-Tempered Clavier, Book 2: Prelude and Fugue No. 10 in E minor
 BWV 880 – Well-Tempered Clavier, Book 2: Prelude and Fugue No. 11 in F major
 BWV 881 – Well-Tempered Clavier, Book 2: Prelude and Fugue No. 12 in F minor
 BWV 882 – Well-Tempered Clavier, Book 2: Prelude and Fugue No. 13 in F-sharp major
 BWV 883 – Well-Tempered Clavier, Book 2: Prelude and Fugue No. 14 in F-sharp minor
 BWV 884 – Well-Tempered Clavier, Book 2: Prelude and Fugue No. 15 in G major
 BWV 885 – Well-Tempered Clavier, Book 2: Prelude and Fugue No. 16 in G minor
 BWV 886 – Well-Tempered Clavier, Book 2: Prelude and Fugue No. 17 in A-flat major
 BWV 887 – Well-Tempered Clavier, Book 2: Prelude and Fugue No. 18 in G-sharp minor
 BWV 888 – Well-Tempered Clavier, Book 2: Prelude and Fugue No. 19 in A major
 BWV 889 – Well-Tempered Clavier, Book 2: Prelude and Fugue No. 20 in A minor
 BWV 890 – Well-Tempered Clavier, Book 2: Prelude and Fugue No. 21 in B-flat major
 BWV 891 – Well-Tempered Clavier, Book 2: Prelude and Fugue No. 22 in B-flat minor
 BWV 892 – Well-Tempered Clavier, Book 2: Prelude and Fugue No. 23 in B major
 BWV 893 – Well-Tempered Clavier, Book 2: Prelude and Fugue No. 24 in B minor
 BWV 894 – Prelude and Fugue in A minor
 BWV 895 – Prelude and Fugue in A minor
 BWV 896 – Prelude and Fugue in A major
 BWV 897:
 BWV 897/1 – Prelude in A minor
 BWV 897/2 – Fugue in A minor
 BWV 898 – Prelude and Fugue in B-flat major on the name B-A-C-H
 BWV 899 – Prelude and Fughetta in D minor
 BWV 900 – Prelude and Fughetta in E minor
 BWV 901 – Prelude and Fughetta in F major
 BWV 902 – Prelude and Fughetta in G major
 BWV 902a – Prelude in G major (alternative version of BWV 902)
 BWV 903 – Chromatic Fantasia and Fugue in D minor
 BWV 903a – Chromatic Fantasia in D minor (alternative version of BWV 903)
 BWV 904 – Fantasia and Fugue in A minor
 BWV 905 – Fantasia and Fugue in D minor
 BWV 906 – Fantasia and Fugue in C minor (fugue unfinished)
 BWV 907 – Fantasia and Fughetta in B-flat major
 BWV 908 – Fantasia and Fughetta in D major
 BWV 909 – Concerto and Fugue in C minor
 BWV 910 – Toccata in F-sharp minor
 BWV 911 – Toccata in C minor
 BWV 912 – Toccata in D major
 BWV 913 – Toccata in D minor
 BWV 914 – Toccata in E minor
 BWV 915 – Toccata in G minor
 BWV 916 – Toccata in G major
 BWV 917 – Fantasia in G minor
 BWV 918 – Fantasia in C minor
 BWV 919 – Fantasia in C minor
 BWV 920 – Fantasia in G minor
 BWV 921 – Prelude in C minor
 BWV 922 – Prelude in A minor
 BWV 923 – Prelude in B minor
 BWV 923a – Prelude in A minor (variant of BWV 923)
 BWV 924 – Prelude in C major
 BWV 924a – Prelude in C major
 BWV 925 – Prelude in D major
 BWV 926 – Prelude in D minor
 BWV 927 – Prelude in F major
 BWV 928 – Prelude in F major
 BWV 929 – Trio (or) Prelude in G minor
 BWV 930 – Prelude in G minor
 BWV 931 – Prelude in A minor
 BWV 932 – Prelude in E minor (incomplete)
 BWV 933 – Six Little Preludes No. 1 in C major
 BWV 934 – Six Little Preludes No. 2 in C minor
 BWV 935 – Six Little Preludes No. 3 in D minor
 BWV 936 – Six Little Preludes No. 4 in D major
 BWV 937 – Six Little Preludes No. 5 in E major
 BWV 938 – Six Little Preludes No. 6 in E minor
 BWV 939 – Prelude in C major
 BWV 940 – Prelude in D minor
 BWV 941 – Prelude in E minor
 BWV 942 – Prelude in A minor
 BWV 943 – Prelude in C major
 BWV 944 – Fantasia and Fugue in A minor
 BWV 945 – Fugue in E minor
 BWV 946 – Fugue in C major
 BWV 947 – Fugue in A minor
 BWV 948 – Fugue in D minor
 BWV 949 – Fugue in A major
 BWV 950 – Fugue in A major on a theme by Tomaso Albinoni
 BWV 951 – Fugue in B minor on a theme by Tomaso Albinoni
 BWV 951a – Fugue in B minor (alternative version of BWV 951)
 BWV 952 – Fugue in C major
 BWV 953 – Fugue in C major
 BWV 954 – Fugue in B-flat major on a theme by Johann Adam Reincken
 BWV 955 – Fugue in B-flat major
 BWV 956 – Fugue in E minor
 BWV 957 – Machs mit mir, Gott, nach deiner Güt (chorale prelude for organ in the Neumeister Collection, previously listed as Fugue in G major)
 BWV 958 – Fugue in A minor
 BWV 959 – Fugue in A minor
 BWV 960 – Fugue in E minor
 BWV 961 – Fughetta in C minor
 BWV 962 – Fughetta in E minor
 BWV 963 – Sonata in D major
 BWV 964 – Sonata in D minor (arrangement of Sonata No. 2 for solo violin, BWV 1003)
 BWV 965 – Sonata in A minor (after Johann Adam Reincken's Hortus Musicus, Nos. 1–5)
 BWV 966 – Sonata in C major (after Johann Adam Reincken's Hortus Musicus, Nos. 11–15)
 BWV 967 – Sonata in A minor (one movement, arrangement)
 BWV 968 – Adagio in G major (after BWV 1005/1)
 BWV 969 – Andante in G minor
 BWV 970 – Presto in D minor
 BWV 971 – Italian Concerto, in F major
 BWV 972 – Concerto in D major, after Antonio Vivaldi's Violin Concerto in D major, Op. 3 No. 9 (RV 230)
 BWV 973 – Concerto in G major, after Antonio Vivaldi's Violin Concerto in G major, Op. 7 No. 8 (RV 299)
 BWV 974 – Concerto in D minor, after Alessandro Marcello's Oboe Concerto in D minor
 BWV 975 – Concerto in G minor, after Antonio Vivaldi's Violin Concerto in G minor, RV 316, a variant of which was published as his Op. 4 No. 6 (RV 316a)
 BWV 976 – Concerto in C major, after Antonio Vivaldi's Violin Concerto in E major, Op. 3 No. 12 (RV 265)
 BWV 977 – Concerto in C major, after an unknown model
 BWV 978 – Concerto in F major, after Antonio Vivaldi's Violin Concerto in G major, Op. 3 No. 3 (RV 310)
 BWV 979 – Concerto in B minor, after Antonio Vivaldi's Violin Concerto in D minor, RV 813 (formerly RV Anh. 10)
 BWV 980 – Concerto in G major, after Antonio Vivaldi's Violin Concerto in B-flat major, Op. 4 No. 1 (RV 383a)
 BWV 981 – Concerto in C minor, after Benedetto Marcello's Concerto Op. 1 No. 2
 BWV 982 – Concerto in B-flat major, after Prince Johann Ernst of Saxe-Weimar's Concerto Op. 1 No. 1
 BWV 983 – Concerto in G minor, after an unknown model
 BWV 984 – Concerto in C major, after a lost Concerto by Prince Johann Ernst of Saxe–Weimar (see BWV 595 for organ version)
 BWV 985 – Concerto in G minor, after Georg Philipp Telemann's Violin Concerto TWV 51:g1
 BWV 986 – Concerto in G major, after an unknown model
 BWV 987 – Concerto in D minor, after Prince Johann Ernst of Saxe–Weimar's Concerto Op. 1 No. 4
 BWV 988 – Goldberg Variations (published as Fourth Clavier-Übung)
 BWV 989 – Aria variata alla maniera italiana, in A minor
 BWV 990 – Sarabande con Partite in C major
 BWV 991 – Air with variations in C minor (fragment)
 BWV 992 – Capriccio sopra la lontananza del suo fratello dilettissimo, in B-flat major
 BWV 993 – Capriccio in honorem Johann Christoph Bachii Ohrdrufiensis, in E major
 BWV 994 – Applicatio in C major
 BWV 995 – Lute Suite in G minor (transcription of Cello Suite No. 5, BWV 1011)
 BWV 996 – Lute Suite in E minor
 BWV 997 – Suite in C minor:
 BWV 997.1 – 1st version, for Lautenwerk (lute-harpsichord)
 BWV 997.2 – 2nd version, for lute
 BWV 998 – Prelude, Fugue and Allegro in E-flat major
 BWV 999 – Prelude in C minor
 BWV 1000 – Fugue in G minor (after BWV 1001/1)
 BWV 1001 – Violin Sonata No. 1 in G minor
 BWV 1002 – Violin Partita No. 1 in B minor
 BWV 1003 – Violin Sonata No. 2 in A minor
 BWV 1004 – Violin Partita No. 2 in D minor
 BWV 1005 – Violin Sonata No. 3 in C major
 BWV 1006:
 BWV 1006.1 (previously 1006) – Violin Partita No. 3 in E major
 BWV 1006.2 (previously 1006a) – Suite in E major (for lute?) after BWV 1006
 BWV 1007 – Cello Suite No. 1 in G major
 BWV 1008 – Cello Suite No. 2 in D minor
 BWV 1009 – Cello Suite No. 3 in C major
 BWV 1010 – Cello Suite No. 4 in E-flat major
 BWV 1011 – Cello Suite No. 5 in C minor
 BWV 1012 – Cello Suite No. 6 in D major
 BWV 1013 – Partita in A minor for solo flute
 BWV 1014 – Sonata for violin and harpsichord in B minor
 BWV 1015 – Sonata for violin and harpsichord in A major
 BWV 1016 – Sonata for violin and harpsichord in E major
 BWV 1017 – Sonata for violin and harpsichord in C minor
 BWV 1018 – Sonata for violin and harpsichord in F minor:
 BWV 1018.1 (previously 1018a) – early version of 3rd movement
 BWV 1018.2 (previously 1018) – with revised version of 3rd movement
 BWV 1019 – Sonata for violin and harpsichord in G major:
 BWV 1019.1 (previously 1019a, 1st version) – version in 6 movements with early versions of movements 2–5.
 BWV 1019.2 (previously 1019a, 2nd version) – 5 movements with revised 2nd movement and new version of 3rd movement.
 BWV 1019.3 (previously 1019) – version in 5 movements with new versions of movements 3–5.
 BWV 1020 – Sonata in G minor for violin and harpsichord
 BWV 1021 – Sonata in G major for violin and basso continuo
 BWV 1022 – Sonata in F major for violin and harpsichord
 BWV 1023 – Sonata in E minor for violin and basso continuo
 BWV 1024 – Sonata in C minor for violin and basso continuo
 BWV 1025 – Suite in A major for violin and harpsichord (after Sylvius Leopold Weiss):
 BWV 1025.1 – complete version 
 BWV 1025.2 – variant: incomplete autograph
 BWV 1026 – Fugue in G minor for violin and harpsichord
 BWV 1027 – Sonata for viola da gamba and harpsichord No. 1 in G major (arrangement of BWV 1039)
 BWV 1027a – Trio in G major for organ (arrangement of BWV 1027/4)
 BWV 1028 – Sonata for viola da gamba and harpsichord No. 2 in D major
 BWV 1029 – Sonata for viola da gamba and harpsichord No. 3 in G minor
 BWV 1030:
 BWV 1030.1 (previously 1030a) – Sonata in G minor for melody instrument and harpsichord (part for melody instrument lost)
 BWV 1030.2 (previously 1030) – Sonata in B minor for flute and harpsichord (after BWV 1030.1)
 BWV 1031 – Sonata in E-flat major for flute and harpsichord
 BWV 1032 – Sonata in A major for flute and harpsichord
 BWV 1033 – Sonata in C major for flute and basso continuo
 BWV 1034 – Sonata in E minor for flute and basso continuo
 BWV 1035 – Sonata in E major for flute and basso continuo
 BWV 1036 – Sonata in D minor for 2 violins and keyboard
 BWV 1037 – Sonata in C major for 2 violins and keyboard
 BWV 1038 – Sonata in G major for flute, violin and keyboard
 BWV 1039 – Sonata in G major for 2 flutes and basso continuo
 BWV 1040 – Canonic Trio Sonata in F major, based on material found in BWV 208
 BWV 1041 – Violin Concerto in A minor
 BWV 1042 – Violin Concerto in E major
 BWV 1043 – Concerto for 2 violins in D minor
 BWV 1044 – Concerto for flute, violin and harpsichord in A minor
 BWV 1045 – Violin Concerto movement in D major, abandoned opening movement (sinfonia) to a lost cantata
 BWV 1046 – Brandenburg Concerto No. 1 in F major for violino piccolo, three oboes, bassoon, two corni da caccia, strings and continuo
 BWV 1046.1 (previously 1046a, and before that 1071) – Sinfonia in F major (early version of 1st Brandenburg Concerto)
 BWV 1046.2 (previously 1046) – revised version
 BWV 1047 – Brandenburg Concerto No. 2 in F major for trumpet, oboe, recorder, violin, strings and continuo
 BWV 1048 – Brandenburg Concerto No. 3 in G major for three violins, three violas, three cellos and continuo
 BWV 1049 – Brandenburg Concerto No. 4 in G major for violin, two fiauti d'echo (recorders), strings and continuo
 BWV 1050 – Brandenburg Concerto No. 5 in D major for harpsichord, violin, flute and strings:
 BWV 1050.1 (previously 1050a) – early version
 BWV 1050.2 (previously 1050) – revised version
 BWV 1051 – Brandenburg Concerto No. 6 in B-flat major for two violas, two violas da gamba, cello and continuo
 BWV 1052 – Concerto for harpsichord and strings in D minor:
 BWV 1052.1 (previously 1052a) – early version
 BWV 1052.2 (previously 1052) – revised version
 BWV 1053 – Concerto for harpsichord and strings in E major
 BWV 1054 – Concerto for harpsichord and strings in D major (after BWV 1042)
 BWV 1055 – Concerto for harpsichord and strings in A major
 BWV 1056 – Concerto for harpsichord and strings in F minor
 BWV 1057 – Concerto for harpsichord, 2 recorders and strings in F major (after BWV 1049)
 BWV 1058 – Concerto for harpsichord and strings in G minor (after BWV 1041)
 BWV 1059 – Concerto for harpsichord in D minor (incomplete, after BWV 35/1)
 BWV 1060 – Concerto for 2 harpsichords and strings in C minor
 BWV 1061 – Concerto for 2 harpsichords in C major:
 BWV 1061.1 (previously 1061a) – early version, without orchestral accompaniment
 BWV 1061.2 (previously 1061) – later version, with string orchestra accompaniment
 BWV 1062 – Concerto for 2 harpsichords and strings in C minor (after BWV 1043)
 BWV 1063 – Concerto for 3 harpsichords and strings in D minor
 BWV 1064 – Concerto for 3 harpsichords and strings in C major
 BWV 1065 – Concerto for 4 harpsichords and strings in A minor, after Antonio Vivaldi's Concerto for four violins in B minor, Op. 3 No. 10 (RV 580)
 BWV 1066 – Orchestral Suite No. 1 in C major (for woodwinds, strings and continuo)
 BWV 1067 – Orchestral Suite No. 2 in B minor (for flute, strings and continuo)
 BWV 1068 – Orchestral Suite No. 3 in D major (for oboes, trumpets, timpani, strings and continuo)
 BWV 1069 – Orchestral Suite No. 4 in D major (for oboes, bassoon, trumpets, timpani, strings and continuo)
 BWV 1070 – Orchestral Suite in G minor
 BWV 1071, renumbered as BWV 1046.1: early version of the first Brandenburg Concerto BWV 1072 – Canon trias harmonica a 8
 BWV 1073 – Canon a 4 perpetuus
 BWV 1074 – Canon a 4
 BWV 1075 – Canon a 2 perpetuus
 BWV 1076 – Canon triplex a 6
 BWV 1077 – Canone doppio sopr'il soggetto
 BWV 1078 – Canon super fa mi a 7 post tempus musicum
 BWV 1079 – The Musical Offering
 BWV 1080 – The Art of Fugue:
 BWV 1080.1 – autograph version
 BWV 1080.2 – print version (published posthumously)
 BWV 1081 – Credo intonation in F major for a Mass by Giovanni Battista Bassani (church music in Latin)
 BWV 1082 – Suscepit Israel for Antonio Caldara's Magnificat in C major (church music in Latin)
 BWV 1083 – Tilge, Höchster, meine Sünden, after Pergolesi's Stabat Mater
 BWV 1084 – "O hilf Christe, Gottes Sohn" (four-part chorale)
 BWV 1085 – O Lamm Gottes, unschuldig (chorale prelude)
 BWV 1086 – Canon concordia discors
 BWV 1087 – 14 canons on the first eight notes of the Goldberg Variations ground (discovered 1974)
 BWV 1088 – "So heb ich denn mein Auge sehnlich auf" (arioso)
 BWV 1089 – "Da Jesus an dem Kreutze stund" (four-part chorale)
 BWV 1090 – Wir Christenleut (chorale prelude from Neumeister Collection)
 BWV 1091 – Das alte Jahr vergangen ist (chorale prelude from Neumeister Collection)
 BWV 1092 – Herr Gott, nun schleuß den Himmel auf (chorale prelude from Neumeister Collection)
 BWV 1093 – Herzliebster Jesu, was hast du verbrochen (chorale prelude from Neumeister Collection)
 BWV 1094 – O Jesu, wie ist dein Gestalt (chorale prelude from Neumeister Collection)
 BWV 1095 – O Lamm Gottes unschuldig (chorale prelude from Neumeister Collection)
 BWV 1096 – Christe, der du bist Tag und Licht (or) Wir danken dir, Herr Jesu Christ (chorale prelude from Neumeister Collection)
 BWV 1097 – Ehre sei dir, Christe, der du leidest Not (chorale prelude from Neumeister Collection)
 BWV 1098 – Erhalt uns, Herr, bei deinem Wort (chorale prelude from Neumeister Collection)
 BWV 1099 – Aus tiefer Not schrei ich zu dir (chorale prelude from Neumeister Collection)
 BWV 1100 – Allein zu dir, Herr Jesu Christ (chorale prelude from Neumeister Collection)
 BWV 1101 – Durch Adams Fall ist ganz verderbt (chorale prelude from Neumeister Collection)
 BWV 1102 – Du Friedefürst, Herr Jesu Christ (chorale prelude from Neumeister Collection)
 BWV 1103 – Erhalt uns, Herr, bei deinem Wort (chorale prelude from Neumeister Collection)
 BWV 1104 – Wenn dich Unglück tut greifen an (chorale prelude from Neumeister Collection)
 BWV 1105 – Jesu, meine Freude (chorale prelude from Neumeister Collection)
 BWV 1106 – Gott ist mein Heil, mein Hilf und Trost (chorale prelude from Neumeister Collection)
 BWV 1107 – Jesu, meines Lebens Leben (chorale prelude from Neumeister Collection)
 BWV 1108 – Als Jesus Christus in der Nacht (chorale prelude from Neumeister Collection)
 BWV 1109 – Ach Gott, tu dich erbarmen (chorale prelude from Neumeister Collection)
 BWV 1110 – O Herre Gott, dein göttlich Wort (chorale prelude from Neumeister Collection)
 BWV 1111 – Nun lasset uns den Leib begrab'n (chorale prelude from Neumeister Collection)
 BWV 1112 – Christus, der ist mein Leben (chorale prelude from Neumeister Collection)
 BWV 1113 – Ich hab mein Sach Gott heimgestellt (chorale prelude from Neumeister Collection)
 BWV 1114 – Herr Jesu Christ, du höchstes Gut (chorale prelude from Neumeister Collection)
 BWV 1115 – Herzlich lieb hab ich dich, o Herr (chorale prelude from Neumeister Collection)
 BWV 1116 – Was Gott tut, das ist wohlgetan (chorale prelude from Neumeister Collection)
 BWV 1117 – Alle Menschen müssen sterben (chorale prelude from Neumeister Collection)
 BWV 1118 – Werde munter, mein Gemüte (chorale prelude from Neumeister Collection)
 BWV 1119 – Wie nach einer Wasserquelle (chorale prelude from Neumeister Collection)
 BWV 1120 – Christ, der du bist der helle Tag (chorale prelude from Neumeister Collection)
 BWV 1121 (previously BWV Anh. 205) – Fantasia in C minor for organ
 BWV 1122 – "Denket doch, ihr Menschenkinder" (four-part chorale)
 BWV 1123 – "Wo Gott zum Haus gibt nicht sein Gunst" (four-part chorale)
 BWV 1124 – "Ich ruf zu dir, Herr Jesu Christ" (four-part chorale)
 BWV 1125 – "O Gott, du frommer Gott" (four-part chorale)
 BWV 1126 – "Lobet Gott, unsern Herren" (four-part chorale)

Numbers above BWV 1126

BWV numbers above 1126 were assigned from the first decade of the 21st century.

 BWV 1127 – Alles mit Gott und nichts ohn' ihn (strophic aria composed in 1713, rediscovered in 2005)
 BWV 1128 (Anh. 71) – Wo Gott der Herr nicht bei uns hält (chorale fantasia for organ authenticated in 2008)
 BWV 1129 – 
 BWV 1130 – 
 BWV 1131 – 
 BWV 1132 – Counterpoint studies with Wilhelm Friedemann Bach
 BWV 1133 –  (thorough-bass rules I)
 BWV 1134 – Precepts and Principles For Playing the Thorough-Bass or Accompanying in Four Parts (thorough-bass rules II)
 BWV 1135 (Anh. 199) – Siehe, eine Jungfrau ist schwanger (lost cantata)
 BWV 1136 (Anh. 209) – Liebster Gott, vergißt du mich (lost cantata)
 BWV 1137 (Anh. 2) – Cantata with an unknown title, possibly Gott, du Richter der Gedanken, for the 19th Sunday after Trinity (lost, apart from a short musical sketch)
 BWV 1138 – lost  cantatas for Mühlhausen:
 BWV 1138.1 (Anh. 192) – 1709
 BWV 1138.2 – 1710
 BWV 1139 – Wünschet Jerusalem Glück (two versions of a lost cantata):
 BWV 1139.2 (Anh. 4a) – for the 200th Anniversary of the Augsburg Confession
 BWV 1140 (Anh. 3) – Gott, gib dein Gerichte dem Könige (lost cantata)
 BWV 1141 (Anh. 193) – Herrscher des Himmels, König der Ehren (lost cantata)
 BWV 1142 – Was ist, das wir Leben nennen (lost cantata)
 BWV 1143 (244a) – Klagt, Kinder, klagt es aller Welt (cantata, music based on BWV 198 and 244b)
 BWV 1144 (Anh. 14) – Sein Segen fließt daher wie ein Strom (lost cantata)
 BWV 1145 (Anh. 211) – Der Herr ist freundlich dem, der auf ihn harret (lost cantata)
 BWV 1146 (Anh. 212) – Vergnügende Flammen, verdoppelt die Macht (lost cantata)
 BWV 1147 (Anh. 5) – Lobet den Herrn, alle seine Heerscharen (lost cantata)
 BWV 1148 (Anh. 15) – Siehe, der Hüter Israel (lost cantata)
 BWV 1149 – Der Gerechte kömmt um after motet Tristis est anima mea (attributed to Kuhnau)
 BWV 1150 (Anh. 197) – Ihr wallenden Wolken (lost cantata)
 BWV 1151 (Anh. 6) – Dich loben die lieblichen Strahlen der Sonne (lost secular cantata)
 BWV 1152 (Anh. 8) – congratulation cantata for New Year (lost secular cantata)
 BWV 1153 (Anh. 7) – Heut ist gewiss ein guter Tag (lost secular cantata)
 BWV 1154 (Anh. 194) – O vergnügte Stunden (lost cantata)
 BWV 1155 (Anh. 20) – Latin ode (lost secular cantata)
 BWV 1156 (Anh. 9) – Entfernet euch, ihr heitern Sterne (lost secular cantata)
 BWV 1157 (Anh. 11) – Es lebe der König, der Vater im Lande (lost secular cantata)
 BWV 1158 (Anh. 12) – Frohes Volk, vergnügte Sachsen (lost secular cantata)
 BWV 1159 – Serenade (lost secular cantata)
 BWV 1160 (Anh. 10)  – So kämpfet nur, ihr muntern Töne (lost secular cantata)
 BWV 1161 (Anh. 13) – Willkommen! Ihr herrschenden Götter der Erden (lost secular cantata)
 BWV 1162 (Anh. 18) – Froher Tag, verlangte Stunden (lost secular cantata)
 BWV 1163 (Anh. 196) – Auf, süß-entzückende Gewalt (lost secular cantata)
 BWV 1164 (Anh. 159)  –  (motet)
 BWV 1165 – Contributions to Keiser's Markus-Passion
 BWV 1166 – Single movements in the Passion-Pasticcio Wer ist der, so von Edom kömmt  
 BWV 1167 (Anh. 213) – Organ concerto in F major after a lost concerto by Georg Philipp Telemann (lost)
 BWV 1168 (Anh. 200) – O Traurigkeit, o Herzeleid (fragment)
 BWV 1169 (Anh. 55) – Herr Christ, der einig Gotts Sohn BWV 1170 (Anh. 77) – Herr Christ, der einig Gotts Sohn BWV 1171 – Auf meinen lieben Gott (Emans 30)
 BWV 1172 – Herr Christ, der einig Gotts Sohn (Emans 85)
 BWV 1173 – Ich ruf zu dir, Herr Jesu Christ (Emans 111)
 BWV 1174 – Komm, heiliger Geist, erfüll die Herzen (Emans 122)
 BWV 1175 – Es ist das Heil uns kommen her (deest)
 BWV 1176 – Herr Christ, der einig Gottes Sohn (Emans 84)

|- id="Strophic aria (BWV 1127)" style="background: #E3F6CE;"
| data-sort-value="1127.000" | 1127
| data-sort-value="448.051" | 
| 1713-10-30
| aria "Alles mit Gott und nichts ohn' ihn"
| C maj.
| s Str Bc
| 
| data-sort-value="X: 237" | Sppl: 237
| text by 
| 
|- id="BWV 1128"
| data-sort-value="1128.000" | 1128
| data-sort-value="462.033" | II
| data-sort-value="1707-12-31" | 
| chorale setting "Wo Gott der Herr nicht bei uns hält"
| G min.
| Organ
| 
| data-sort-value="IV/10" | IV/10
| after Z 4441a; was BWV Anh. 71
| 
|- id="BWV 1129"
| data-sort-value="1129.000" | 1129
| data-sort-value="448.0524" | 
| data-sort-value="1743-12-31" | 
| music theory 
| 
| 
| 
| data-sort-value="X: 063" | Sppl: 63
| 
| 
|- id="BWV 1130" style="background: #E3F6CE;"
| data-sort-value="1130.000" | 1130
| data-sort-value="448.0525" | 
| data-sort-value="1742-12-31" | 
| music theory 
| 
| 
| 
| data-sort-value="X: 045" | Sppl: 45
| 
| 
|- id="BWV 1131" style="background: #E3F6CE;"
| data-sort-value="1131.000" | 1131
| data-sort-value="448.0526" | 
| data-sort-value="1744-12-31" | 
| music theory 
| 
| 
| 
| data-sort-value="X: 041" | Sppl: 41
| 
| 
|- id="BWV 1132" style="background: #E3F6CE;"
| data-sort-value="1132.000" | 1132
| data-sort-value="448.0527" | 
| data-sort-value="1737-12-31" | 
| Counterpoint studies with W. F. Bach
| 
| 
| 
| data-sort-value="X: 067" | Sppl: 67
| 
| 
|- id="BWV 1133" style="background: #F5F6CE;"
| data-sort-value="1133.000" | 1133
| data-sort-value="448.0528" | 
| data-sort-value="1742-12-31" | 
| thorough-bass rules I Einige höchst nöthige Regeln vom General Basse
| 
| 
| 
| data-sort-value="V/04: 131" | V/4: 131Sppl: 37
| 
| 
|- id="BWV 1134" style="background: #F6E3CE;"
| data-sort-value="1134.000" | 1134
| data-sort-value="448.0529" | 
| data-sort-value="1738-07-01" | 1738?
| thorough-bass rules II Precepts and Principles For Playing the Thorough-Bass or Accompanying in Four Parts
| 
| 
| 
| data-sort-value="X: 003" | Sppl: 3
| 
| 
|- id="BWV 1135"
| data-sort-value="1135.000" | 1135
| data-sort-value="455.006" | I
| 1724-03-25
| Cantata Siehe, eine Jungfrau ist schwanger (25 March: Annunciation)
| 
| 
| 
| 
| was BWV Anh. 199; text extantHobohm, BJ 1973: 5ff
| 
|- id="BWV 1136"
| data-sort-value="1136.000" | 1136 	
| data-sort-value="456.003" | I
| data-sort-value="1712-12-31" | 1708–1717?1725-09-09?1727-02-06
| Cantata Liebster Gott, vergißt du mich (1711: libretto for Trin. VII; 1725: Trin. XV?; 1727, with BWV 157.1: funeral in Pomßen)
| 
| 
| 
| 
| was BWV Anh. 209; text by LehmsChristine Blanken. "A Cantata-Text Cycle of 1728 from Nuremberg: a Preliminary Report on a Discovery relating to J. S. Bach's so-called 'Third Annual Cantata Cycle'", pp. 9–30 in Understanding Bach, Vol. 10, 2015
| 
|- id="BWV 1137" style="background: #E3F6CE;"
| data-sort-value="1137.000" | 1137  
| data-sort-value="449.052" | I
| data-sort-value="1729-10-23" | 1729-10-23?
| Cantata (sketch: Gott, du Richter der Gedanken for Trinity XIX by Picander?)
| 
| SATB Vl Str Bc
| 
| data-sort-value="III/01" |III/1
| data-sort-value="was BWV Anh. 002" | was BWV Anh. 2; in SBB P 36: 18
| 
|-
| data-sort-value="1138.100" | 1138.1 
| data-sort-value="454.005" | I
| 1709-02-04
| Cantata for Ratswahl in Mühlhausen No. 2
| 
| 
| 
| 
| was BWV Anh. 192
| 
|-
| data-sort-value="1138.200" | 1138.2 
| data-sort-value="448.053" | 
| 1710-02-04
| Cantata for Ratswahl in Mühlhausen No. 3
| 
| 
| 
| 
| lost
| 
|- id="BWV 1139.1"
| data-sort-value="1139.100" | 1139.1
| data-sort-value="450.001" | I
| 1725-08-27
| Cantata Wünschet Jerusalem Glück (council election)
| 
| 
| 
| 
| data-sort-value="was BWV Anh. 004" | was BWV Anh. 4; text by Picander; → BWV 1139.2
| 
|- id="BWV 1139.2"
| data-sort-value="1139.200" | 1139.2
| data-sort-value="450.002" | I
| 1730-06-27
| Cantata Wünschet Jerusalem Glück (200th anniversary of the Augsburg Confession)
| 
| 
| 
| 
| data-sort-value="was BWV Anh. 004a" | was BWV Anh. 4a; text by Picander; after BWV 1139.1
| 
|-
| data-sort-value="1140.000" | 1140  
| data-sort-value="449.053" | I
| 1730-08-25
| Cantata Gott, gib dein Gerichte dem Könige (council election)
| 
| 
| 
| I/32.2
| data-sort-value="was BWV Anh. 003" | was BWV Anh. 3; text by Picander
| 
|- id="BWV 1141"
| data-sort-value="1141.000" | 1141
| data-sort-value="454.004" | I
| 1740-08-29
| Cantata Herrscher des Himmels, König der Ehren (council election)
| 
| 
| 
| I/32.2
| was BWV Anh. 193; text extant; /7 after BWV 208/15?
| 
|- id="BWV 1142"
| data-sort-value="1142.000" | 1142
| data-sort-value="448.054" | 
| 1716-04-02
| Cantata Was ist, das wir Leben nennen (funeral service for Johann Ernst of S.-W.)
| 
| 
| 
| 
| text extant
| 
|-
| data-sort-value="1143.000" | 1143
| data-sort-value="261.001" | 4.
| 1729-03-24
| Cantata Klagt, Kinder, klagt es aller Welt (funeral of Leopold of Anhalt-Köthen; music lost but partially reconstructible)
| 
| 
| 
| I/34
| was BWV 244a; text by Picander; ↔ BWV 198/1, /10, 244b/6, /8, /39, /49, /57, /23, /20, /65, /13, /68
| 
|- id="BWV 1144"
| data-sort-value="1144.000" | 1144 
| data-sort-value="452.002" | I
| 1725-02-12
| Cantata Sein Segen fließt daher wie ein Strom (wedding)
| 
| 
| 
| 
| data-sort-value="was BWV Anh. 014" | was BWV Anh. 14; text extantBC: Werk [B 12]
| 
|- id="BWV 1145"
| data-sort-value="1145.000" | 1145    	
| data-sort-value="456.005" | I
| 1729-01-18
| Cantata Der Herr ist freundlich dem, der auf ihn harret (wedding)
| 
| 
| 
| 
| was BWV Anh. 211; text by PicanderTiggemann, BJ 1994: 7–22
| 
|- id="BWV 1146"
| data-sort-value="1146.000" | 1146 	
| data-sort-value="457.001" | I
| 1729-07-26
| Cantata Vergnügende Flammen, verdoppelt die Macht (wedding)
| 
| 
| 
| 
| was BWV Anh. 212; text by PicanderSchaumburg-Lippische Hofbibliothek Bückeburg, Cb 76 II, Nr. 214
| 
|-
| data-sort-value="1147.000" | 1147
| data-sort-value="450.003" | I
| 1718-12-10
| Cantata Lobet den Herrn, alle seine Heerscharen (birthday of Leopold of A.-K.)
| 
| 
| 
| I/34
| data-sort-value="was BWV Anh. 005" | was BWV Anh. 5; text by Hunold
| 
|- id="BWV 1148"
| data-sort-value="1148.000" | 1148 
| data-sort-value="452.003" | I
| 1724-04-27
| Cantata Siehe, der Hüter Israel (doctorate)
| 
| SATB 3Tr Tmp 2Ob 3Vl Va Bc
| 
| I/34
| data-sort-value="was BWV Anh. 015" | was BWV Anh. 15; lostNeumann BT: 184
| 
|- id="BWV 1150"
| data-sort-value="1150.000" | 1150
| data-sort-value="455.004" | I
| data-sort-value="1721-07-01" | 1721-01-01?1722-01-01?
| Cantata Ihr wallenden Wolken (New Year)
| 
| data-sort-value="b Flx2 Str Vc Hc Bc" | b 2Fl Str Vc Hc Bc
| 
| data-sort-value="I/04" | I/4
| was BWV Anh. 197; lostNeumann, NBA I/4, Krit. Bericht: 118
| 
|- id="BWV 1151"
| data-sort-value="1151.000" | 1151
| data-sort-value="450.004" | I
| 1720-01-01
| Secular cantata Dich loben die lieblichen Strahlen der Sonne (New Year)
| 
| 
| 
| I/35
| data-sort-value="was BWV Anh. 006" | was BWV Anh. 6; text by HunoldSmend Köthen: 27, 69, 195–198
| 
|- id="BWV 1152"
| data-sort-value="1152.000" | 1152
| data-sort-value="451.001" | I
| 1723-01-01
| Secular cantata for New Year (congratulation of Leopold of Anhalt-Köthen and his wife Frederica Henriette)
| 
| 
| 
| I/35
| data-sort-value="was BWV Anh. 008" | was BWV Anh. 8; lost
| 
|- id="BWV 1153"
| data-sort-value="1153.000" | 1153  
| data-sort-value="450.005" | I
| 1720-12-10
| Secular cantata Heut ist gewiß ein guter Tag (birthday of Leopold of Anhalt-Köthen)
| 
| 
| 
| I/35
| data-sort-value="was BWV Anh. 007" | was BWV Anh. 7; text by HunoldSmend Köthen: 27, 69, 199ff
| 
|- id="BWV 1154"
| data-sort-value="1154.000" | 1154
| data-sort-value="455.001" | I
| 1722-07-29
| Cantata O vergnügte Stunden (birthday of John Augustus of Anhalt-Zerbst)
| 
| 
| 
| 
| was BWV Anh. 194; text extantWäschke. "Eine noch unbekannte Komposition J. S. Bachs" in SIMG 10 (1908/09): 633f
| 
|- id="BWV 1155"
| data-sort-value="1155.000" | 1155
| data-sort-value="453.004" | I
| 1723-08-09
| Ode in Latin (birthday of Frederick II of Saxe-Gotha)
| 
| 
| 
| I/38
| data-sort-value="was BWV Anh. 020" | was BWV Anh. 20; lostNeumann, NBA I/38, Krit. Bericht: 10
| 
|-
| data-sort-value="1156.000" | 1156 
| data-sort-value="451.002" | I
| 1727-05-12
| Secular cantata Entfernet euch, ihr heitern Sterne (57th birthday of Augustus II)
| 
| 
| 
| I/36
| data-sort-value="was BWV Anh. 009" | was BWV Anh. 9; text by Haupt, C. F.; /1 → BWV 232II/6?Neumann, NBA I/36, Krit. Bericht: 11ff
| 
|-
| data-sort-value="1157.000" | 1157
| data-sort-value="451.004" | I
| 1732-08-03
| Secular cantata Es lebe der König, der Vater im Lande (name day of Augustus II)
| 
| 
| 
| I/36
| data-sort-value="was BWV Anh. 011" | was BWV Anh. 11; text by Picander; /1 & /11 → BWV 215/1 → 232IV/1=/3; /7 → 248/39?; /9 → 212/14
| 
|- id="BWV 1158"
| data-sort-value="1158.000" | 1158
| data-sort-value="451.005" | I
| 1733-08-03
| Secular cantata Frohes Volk, vergnügte Sachsen (name day of Augustus III)
| 
| 
| 
| I/36
| data-sort-value="was BWV Anh. 012" | was BWV Anh. 12; text by Picander; after BWV Anh. 18; /1 → BWV 11/1
| 
|- id="BWV 1159"
| data-sort-value="1159.000" | 1159
| data-sort-value="448.055" | 
| 1739-10-07
| Secular cantata "Serenade" (birthday of Augustus III)
| 
| 
| 
| 
| lost
| 
|- id="BWV 1160"
| data-sort-value="1160.000" | 1160
| data-sort-value="451.003" | I
| 1731-08-25
| Secular cantata So kämpfet nur, ihr muntern Töne (birthday of )
| 
| 
| 
| I/39
| data-sort-value="was BWV Anh. 010" | was BWV Anh. 10; text by Picander; /1 → BWV 248VIa/1?Neumann, NBA I/39, Krit. Bericht: 42
| 
|- id="BWV 1161"
| data-sort-value="1161.000" | 1161
| data-sort-value="452.001" | I
| 1738-04-28
| Secular cantata Willkommen! Ihr herrschenden Götter der Erden in honour of the royal couple (Augustus III and Maria Josepha), and for the forthcoming marriage of princess Maria Amalia with Charles of Sicily
| 
| 
| 
| I/37
| data-sort-value="was BWV Anh. 013" | was BWV Anh. 13; text by Gottsched, J. C. in Riemersche ChronikDürr, Bericht DuisburgWolff, Bericht Duisburg
| 
|-
| data-sort-value="1162.000" | 1162
| data-sort-value="453.002" | I
| 1732-06-05
| Secular cantata Froher Tag, verlangte Stunden (inauguration of St. Thomas school after renovation)
| 
| 
| 
| I/39
| data-sort-value="was BWV Anh. 018" | was BWV Anh. 18; text by Winckler; /1 → BWV 11/1; /1 /3 /5 /6 /8 /10 → BWV Anh. 12Dürr, Gs Albrecht: 121ff
| 
|- id="BWV 1163"
| data-sort-value="1163.000" | 1163	
| data-sort-value="455.003" | I
| 1725-11-27
| Secular cantata Auf, süß entzückende Gewalt (wedding of Peter, eldest son of Peter Hohmann, and Christiana Sibylla Mencke)
| 
| 
| 
| I/40
| was BWV Anh. 196; text by Gottsched, C.; /3 → BWV 11/4 → 232IV/4; /5 → BWV 11/8Neumann, NBA I/40, Krit. Bericht: 22ffPeter Freiherr von Hohenthal at 
| 
|- style="background: #E3F6CE;"
| data-sort-value="1164.000" | 1164
| data-sort-value="459.007" | II
| data-sort-value="1712-07-01" | 1712–1713or earlier
| Motet Ich lasse dich nicht, du segnest mich denn
| F min.
| data-sort-value="SATBx2" | 2SATB
| data-sort-value="000.39: 157" | 39: 157
| data-sort-value="III/03: 003" | III/3: 3
| by Bach, J. Christoph?; was BWV Anh. 159; ↔ BWV 421 (/2)
| 
|}

BWV Anh. 1–213

Appearing in the BWV Anh.:
 BWV Anh. 1 – Gesegnet ist die Zuversicht (lost cantata)
 BWV Anh. 2 → BWV 1137
 BWV Anh. 3 → BWV 1140
 BWV Anh. 4 → BWV 1139.1
 BWV Anh. 4a → BWV 1139.2
 BWV Anh. 5 → BWV 1147
 BWV Anh. 6 → BWV 1151
 BWV Anh. 7 → BWV 1153
 BWV Anh. 8 → BWV 1152
 BWV Anh. 9 → BWV 1156
 BWV Anh. 10 → BWV 1160
 BWV Anh. 11 → BWV 1157
 BWV Anh. 12 → BWV 1158
 BWV Anh. 13 → BWV 1161
 BWV Anh. 14 → BWV 1144
 BWV Anh. 15 → BWV 1148
 BWV Anh. 16 – Schließt die Gruft, ihr Trauerglocken (lost cantata)
 BWV Anh. 17 – Mein Gott, nimm die gerechte Seele (lost cantata)
 BWV Anh. 18 → BWV 1162
 BWV Anh. 19 – Thomana saß annoch betrübt (lost secular cantata)
 BWV Anh. 20 → BWV 1155
 BWV Anh. 21 – Meine Seel erhebt den Herren a.k.a. Kleine MagnificatFrederick Hudson and Alfred Dürr. "An Investigation into the Authenticity of Bach's ‘Kleine Magnificat’" in Music and Letters XXXVI (3), 1955, pp. 233–36
 BWV Anh. 22 – Concerto for Oboe and Violin in B-flat major
 BWV Anh. 23 – Concerto
 BWV Anh. 24 – Kyrie and Gloria in A minor (church music in Latin)
 BWV Anh. 25 – Kyrie–Gloria Mass in C major (church music in Latin)
 BWV Anh. 26 – Mass in C minor (church music in Latin)
 BWV Anh. 27 – Sanctus in F major (church music in Latin)
 BWV Anh. 28 – Sanctus in B-flat major (composer unknown; church music in Latin)
 BWV Anh. 29 – Mass in C minor (only continuo part extant; church music in Latin)
 BWV Anh. 30 – Magnificat in C major after Pietro Torri (church music in Latin)
 BWV Anh. 31 – "Herr Gott, dich loben alle wir" (four-part chorale)
 BWV Anh. 32 – "Getrost mein Geist, wenn Wind und Wetter krachen" (song from Sammlung Deutsche Übersetzungen und Gedichte)
 BWV Anh. 33 – "Mein Jesus, spare nicht" (song from Sammlung Deutsche Übersetzungen und Gedichte)
 BWV Anh. 34 – "Kann ich mit einem Tone" (song from Sammlung Deutsche Übersetzungen und Gedichte)
 BWV Anh. 35 – "Meine Seele lass die Flügel" (song from Sammlung Deutsche Übersetzungen und Gedichte)
 BWV Anh. 36 – "Ich stimm' itzund ein Straff-Lied an" (song from Sammlung Deutsche Übersetzungen und Gedichte)
 BWV Anh. 37 – "Der schwarze Flügel trüber Nacht" (song from Sammlung Deutsche Übersetzungen und Gedichte)
 BWV Anh. 38 – "Das Finsterniß tritt ein" (song from Sammlung Deutsche Übersetzungen und Gedichte)
 BWV Anh. 39 – "Ach was wollt ihr trüben Sinnen" (song from Sammlung Deutsche Übersetzungen und Gedichte)
 BWV Anh. 40 – "Ich bin nun wie ich bin" (song; text lost)
 BWV Anh. 41 – "Dir zu Liebe, wertes Herze" (song)
 BWV Anh. 42 – Fugue in F major
 BWV Anh. 43 – Fugue in B minor
 BWV Anh. 44 – Fugue in G Major
 BWV Anh. 45 – Fugue on B-A-C-H in B-flat major
 BWV Anh. 46 – Trio in C minor
 BWV Anh. 47 – Ach Herr, mich armen Sünder (chorale prelude)
 BWV Anh. 48 – Allein Gott in der Höh sei Ehr (chorale prelude)
 BWV Anh. 49 – Ein feste Burg (chorale prelude)
 BWV Anh. 50 – Erhalt uns, Herr, hei deinem Wort (chorale prelude)
 BWV Anh. 51 – Erstanden ist der heilge Christ (chorale prelude)
 BWV Anh. 52 – Freu dich sehr, o meine Seele (chorale prelude)
 BWV Anh. 53 – Freu dich sehr, o meine Seele (chorale prelude)
 BWV Anh. 54 – Helft mir Gotts Güte preisen (chorale prelude)
 BWV Anh. 55 – Herr Christ, der einig Gottes Sohn (chorale prelude)
 BWV Anh. 56 – Herr Jesu Christ, dich zu uns wend (chorale prelude)
 BWV Anh. 57 – Jesu, Leiden, Pein und Tod (chorale prelude)
 BWV Anh. 58 – Jesu, meine Freude (chorale prelude)
 BWV Anh. 59 – Jesu, meine Freude (chorale prelude)
 BWV Anh. 60 – Nun lob, mein Seel, den Herren (chorale prelude)
 BWV Anh. 61 – O Mensch, bewein dein Sünde groß (chorale prelude)
 BWV Anh. 62:
 BWV Anh. 62a – Sei Lob und Ehr mit hohem Preis (chorale prelude)
 BWV Anh. 62b – Sei Lob und Ehr mit hohem Preis (chorale prelude)
 BWV Anh. 63 – Vom Himmel hoch (chorale prelude)
 BWV Anh. 64 – Vom Himmel hoch (chorale prelude)
 BWV Anh. 65 – Vom Himmel hoch (chorale prelude)
 BWV Anh. 66 – Wachet auf, ruft uns (chorale prelude)
 BWV Anh. 67 – Was Gott tut, das ist wohlgetan (chorale prelude)
 BWV Anh. 68 – Wer nur den lieben Gott läßt walten (chorale prelude)
 BWV Anh. 69 – Wir glauben all an einen Gott (chorale prelude)
 BWV Anh. 70 – Wir glauben all an einen Gott (chorale prelude)
 BWV Anh. 71 (authenticated and renumbered to BWV 1128)
 BWV Anh. 72 – Christus der uns selig macht (chorale setting; canon for organ)
 BWV Anh. 73 – Ich ruf zu dir, Herr Jesu Christ (chorale prelude; arrangement of BWV 639 by Carl Philipp Emanuel Bach)
 BWV Anh. 74 – Schmücke dich, o liebe Seele (chorale prelude)
 BWV Anh. 75 – Herr Christ, der einig Gottes Sohn (chorale setting)
 BWV Anh. 76 – Jesu, meine Freude (chorale setting)
 BWV Anh. 77 – Herr Christ, der einig Gottes Sohn (chorale variations)
 BWV Anh. 78 – Wenn wir in höchsten Nöten sein (chorale variations)
 BWV Anh. 79 – Befiehl du deine Wege (chorale variations)
 BWV Anh. 80 – Suite in F major
 BWV Anh. 81 – Gigue in D minor (incomplete)
 BWV Anh. 82 – Ciacona in B-flat major
 BWV Anh. 83 – Ciacona in A major
 BWV Anh. 84 – Ciacona in G major
 BWV Anh. 85 – Toccata and Fugue in F minor
 BWV Anh. 86 – Fantasia in C minor
 BWV Anh. 87 – Fantasia in C major
 BWV Anh. 88 – Fugue in C Major
 BWV Anh. 89 – Fugue in C major
 BWV Anh. 90 – Fugue in C major
 BWV Anh. 91 – Fugue in G major
 BWV Anh. 92 – Fugue in G major
 BWV Anh. 93 – Fugue in E minor
 BWV Anh. 94 – Fugue in E minor
 BWV Anh. 95 – Fugue in E minor
 BWV Anh. 96 – Fugue in D major
 BWV Anh. 97 – Fugue in F-sharp major
 BWV Anh. 98 – Fugue in D minor
 BWV Anh. 99 – Fugue in D minor
 BWV Anh. 100 – Fugue in D minor
 BWV Anh. 101 – Fugue in G minor
 BWV Anh. 102 – Fugue in E-flat minor
 BWV Anh. 103 – Fugue
 BWV Anh. 104 – Fugue
 BWV Anh. 105 – Fugue
 BWV Anh. 106 – Fugue
 BWV Anh. 107 – Fugue on B-A-C-H
 BWV Anh. 108 – Fugue on B-A-C-H
 BWV Anh. 109 – Fugue on B-A-C-H
 BWV Anh. 110 – Fugue on B-A-C-H
 BWV Anh. 111 – Largo and Allegro in G major
 BWV Anh. 112 – Grave in E minor
 BWV Anh. 113 – Minuet in F major
 BWV Anh. 114 – Minuet in G major
 BWV Anh. 115 – Minuet in G minor
 BWV Anh. 116 – Minuet in G major
 BWV Anh. 117a and 117b – two Polonaises in F major
 BWV Anh. 118 – Minuet in B-flat major
 BWV Anh. 119 – Polonaise in G minor
 BWV Anh. 120 – Minuet in A minor
 BWV Anh. 121 – Minuet in C minor
 BWV Anh. 122 – March in D major
 BWV Anh. 123 – Polonaise in G minor
 BWV Anh. 124 – March in G major
 BWV Anh. 125 – Polonaise in G minor
 BWV Anh. 126 – Musette in D major
 BWV Anh. 127 – March in E-flat major	
 BWV Anh. 128 – [Polonaise] in D minor
 BWV Anh. 129 – Solo per il cembalo in E-flat major
 BWV Anh. 130 – Polonaise in G major
 BWV Anh. 131 – [March] in F major
 BWV Anh. 132 – Minuet in D minor
 BWV Anh. 133 – Fantasia (piece for a musical clock)
 BWV Anh. 134 – Scherzo (piece for a musical clock)
 BWV Anh. 135 – Burlesca (piece for a musical clock)
 BWV Anh. 136 – Trio (piece for a musical clock)
 BWV Anh. 137 – L'Intrada della Caccia (piece for a musical clock)
 BWV Anh. 138 – Continuazione della Caccia (piece for a musical clock)
 BWV Anh. 139 – Il Fine delle Caccia I (piece for a musical clock)
 BWV Anh. 140 – Il Fine delle Caccia II (piece for a musical clock)
 BWV Anh. 141 – Song of Psalm "O Gott die Christenhalt" (piece for a musical clock)
 BWV Anh. 142 – Psalm 110 (piece for a musical clock)
 BWV Anh. 143 – Polonaise (piece for a musical clock)
 BWV Anh. 144 – Polonaise Trio (piece for a musical clock)
 BWV Anh. 145 – March (piece for a musical clock)
 BWV Anh. 146 – March (piece for a musical clock)
 BWV Anh. 147 – La Combattuta (piece for a musical clock)
 BWV Anh. 148 – Scherzo (piece for a musical clock)
 BWV Anh. 149 – Minuet (piece for a musical clock)
 BWV Anh. 150 – Trio (piece for a musical clock)
 BWV Anh. 151 – Concerto in C major for keyboard
 BWV Anh. 152 – Concerto in G major for keyboard
 BWV Anh. 153 – Sonata in A major for violin and keyboard
 BWV Anh. 154 – Sonata in E-flat major for violin and keyboard
 BWV Anh. 155 – Concerto in A major for keyboard, strings and continuo
 BWV Anh. 156 – Herr Christ, der einge Gottes Sohn (cantata)
 BWV Anh. 157 – Ich habe Lust zu scheiden (cantata)
 BWV Anh. 158 – "Andro dall' colle al prato" (aria)
 BWV Anh. 159 → BWV 1164
 BWV Anh. 160 → BWV App. A 4
 BWV Anh. 161 – Kündlich groß ist das gottselige Geheimnis (motet movement)
 BWV Anh. 162 – Lob und Ehre und Weisheit und Dank (motet)
 BWV Anh. 163 – Merk auf, mein Herz, und sieh dorthin (motet)
 BWV Anh. 164 – Nun danket alle Gott (motet)
 BWV Anh. 165 – Unser Wandel ist im Himmel (motet)
 BWV Anh. 166 – Kyrie–Gloria Mass in E minor known as Missa super cantilena "Allein Gott in der Höh' sei Ehr"
 BWV Anh. 167 – Kyrie–Gloria Mass in G major for double SATB choir and orchestra
 BWV Anh. 168 – Kyrie and German Gloria
 BWV Anh. 169 – Erbauliche Gedanken auf den Grünen Donnerstag und Charfreitag über den Leidenden Jesum (libretto by Picander)
 BWV Anh. 170 – "Welt, ade, ich bin dein müde" (SSATB chorale)
 BWV Anh. 171 – Christ lag in Todesbanden (chorale prelude)
 BWV Anh. 172 – Herr Jesu Christ, dich zu uns wend (chorale prelude)
 BWV Anh. 173 – Invention for violin and keyboard
 BWV Anh. 174 – Invention for violin and keyboard
 BWV Anh. 175 – Invention for violin and keyboard
 BWV Anh. 176 – Invention for violin and keyboard
 BWV Anh. 177 – Prelude and Fugue in E-flat major
 BWV Anh. 178 – Toccata quasi Fantasia con Fuga in A major
 BWV Anh. 179 – Fantasia durch alle Tonarten gehend
 BWV Anh. 180 – Fugue in D minor
 BWV Anh. 181 – Fugue in A minor
 BWV Anh. 182 – Passacaglia in D minor
 BWV Anh. 183 – Rondeau in B-flat major a.k.a. "Les Bergeries"François Couperin. Second Livre de pièces de Clavecin. Paris: Foucault (1717), pp. 8–9
 BWV Anh. 184 – Sonata A minor for violin and continuo
 BWV Anh. 185 – Sonata in D major for two violins and continuo
 BWV Anh. 186 – Trio Sonata in F major for two violins and continuo
 BWV Anh. 187 – Trio in F major
 BWV Anh. 188 – Sonata (Concerto) in F major for two harpsichords
 BWV Anh. 189 – Concerto in A minor for keyboard, strings and continuo
 BWV Anh. 190 – Ich bin ein Pilgrim auf der Welt (lost cantata)
 BWV Anh. 191 – Leb ich oder leb ich nicht (lost cantata)
 BWV Anh. 192 → BWV 1138.1
 BWV Anh. 193 → BWV 1141
 BWV Anh. 194 → BWV 1154
 BWV Anh. 195 – Murmelt nur, ihr heitern Bäche (lost secular cantata)
 BWV Anh. 196 → BWV 1163
 BWV Anh. 197 → BWV 1150
 BWV Anh. 198 → BWV 149/1a
 BWV Anh. 199 → BWV 1135
 BWV Anh. 200 – O Traurigkeit, o herzeleid (chorale prelude; unused sketch for the Orgelbüchlein)
 BWV Anh. 201 – Du Friedefürst, Herr Jesu Christ (four-part chorale)
 BWV Anh. 202 – Gott hat das Evangelium (four-part chorale)
 BWV Anh. 203 – Ich hebe meine Augen auf (four-part chorale)
 BWV Anh. 204 – O Traurigkeit, o Herzeleid (four-part chorale)
 BWV Anh. 205 → BWV 1121
 BWV Anh. 206 – Ach bleib mit deiner Gnade (or) Christus, der ist mein Leben (chorale prelude)
 BWV Anh. 207 – Fugue in E minor
 BWV Anh. 208 – Fugue in E-flat minor
 BWV Anh. 209 → BWV 1136
 BWV Anh. 210 – Wo sind meine Wunderwerke (lost cantata)
 BWV Anh. 211 → BWV 1145
 BWV Anh. 212 → BWV 1146
 BWV Anh. 213 – Concerto in F major for solo organ, after an unidentified concerto by Georg Philipp Telemann

BWV App. A–D

BWV App. A
 BWV App. A 4 (previously Anh. 160) – Jauchzet dem Herrn alle Welt'' (pasticcio motet)

BWV App. B
 BWV 1022
 BWV 1024
 BWV 1070

BWV App. C
 BWV Anh. 25
 BWV Anh. 113
 BWV Anh. 116
 BWV Anh. 117a
 BWV Anh. 117b
 BWV Anh. 118
 BWV Anh. 119
 BWV Anh. 120
 BWV Anh. 121
 BWV Anh. 122
 BWV Anh. 123
 BWV Anh. 124
 BWV Anh. 125
 BWV Anh. 126
 BWV Anh. 127
 BWV Anh. 128
 BWV Anh. 132
 BWV Anh. 167

BWV App. D
 BWV 1020
 BWV 1036
 BWV 1037
 BWV Anh. 24
 BWV Anh. 26
 BWV Anh. 30
 BWV Anh. 114
 BWV Anh. 115
 BWV Anh. 129
 BWV Anh. 130
 BWV Anh. 131
 BWV Anh. 183

Notes

References

Sources

External links

 
 J.S. Bach Works Catalog by David J. Grossman
 Johann Sebastian Bach: Catalogue BWV at  

 
Classical music catalogues